= Havana =

Capital and largest city of Cuba

Havana La Habana (Spanish)
- Capital city
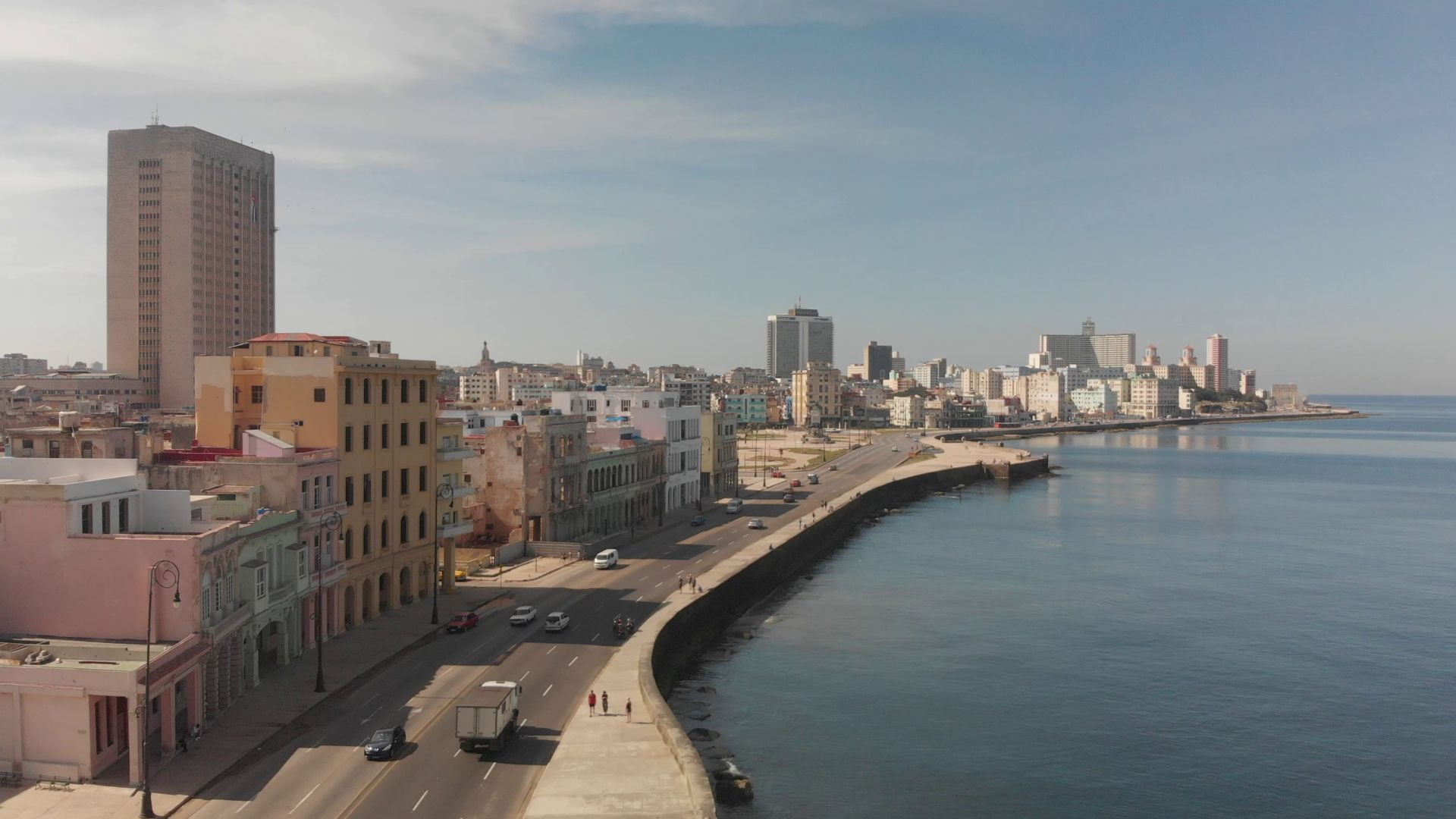
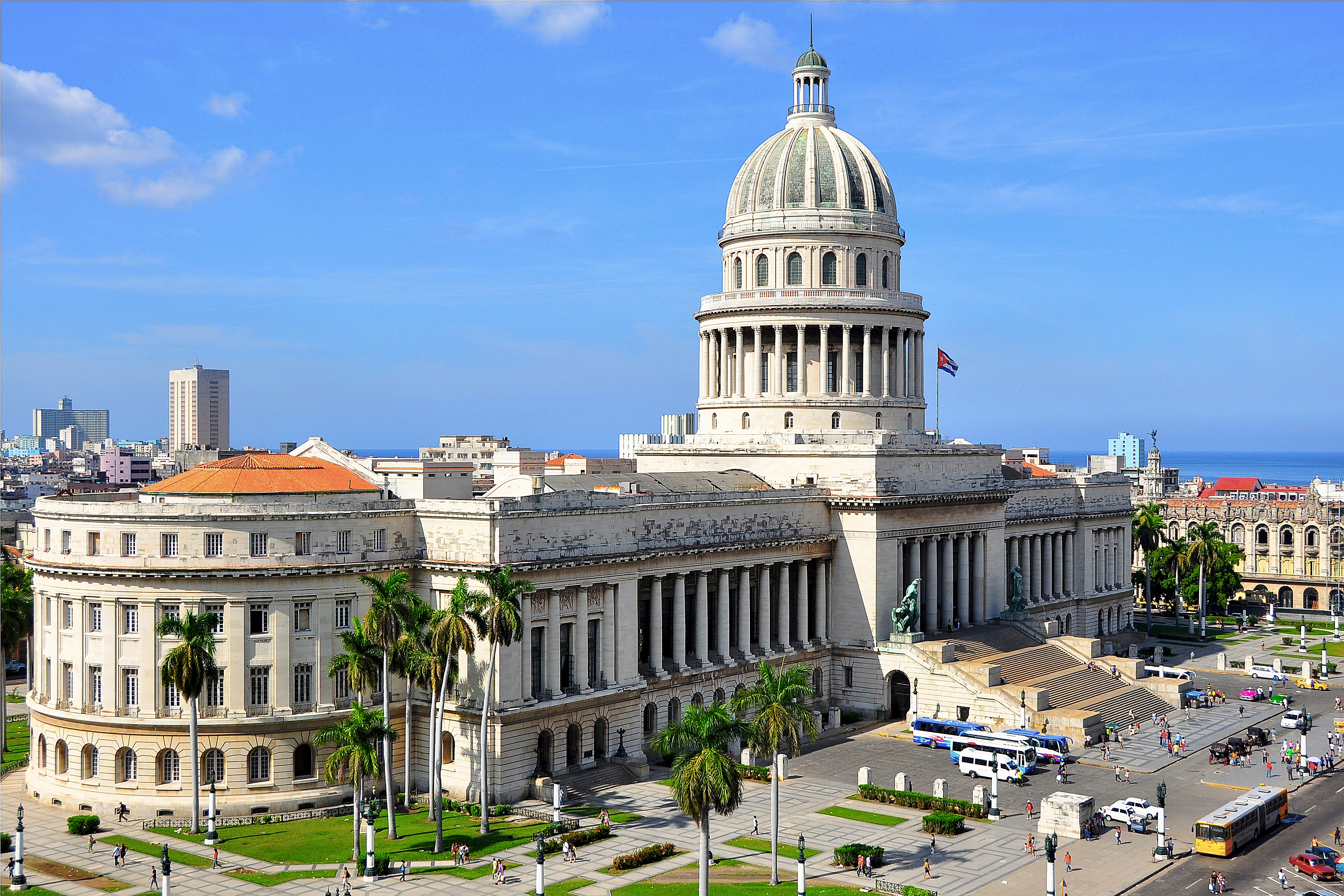
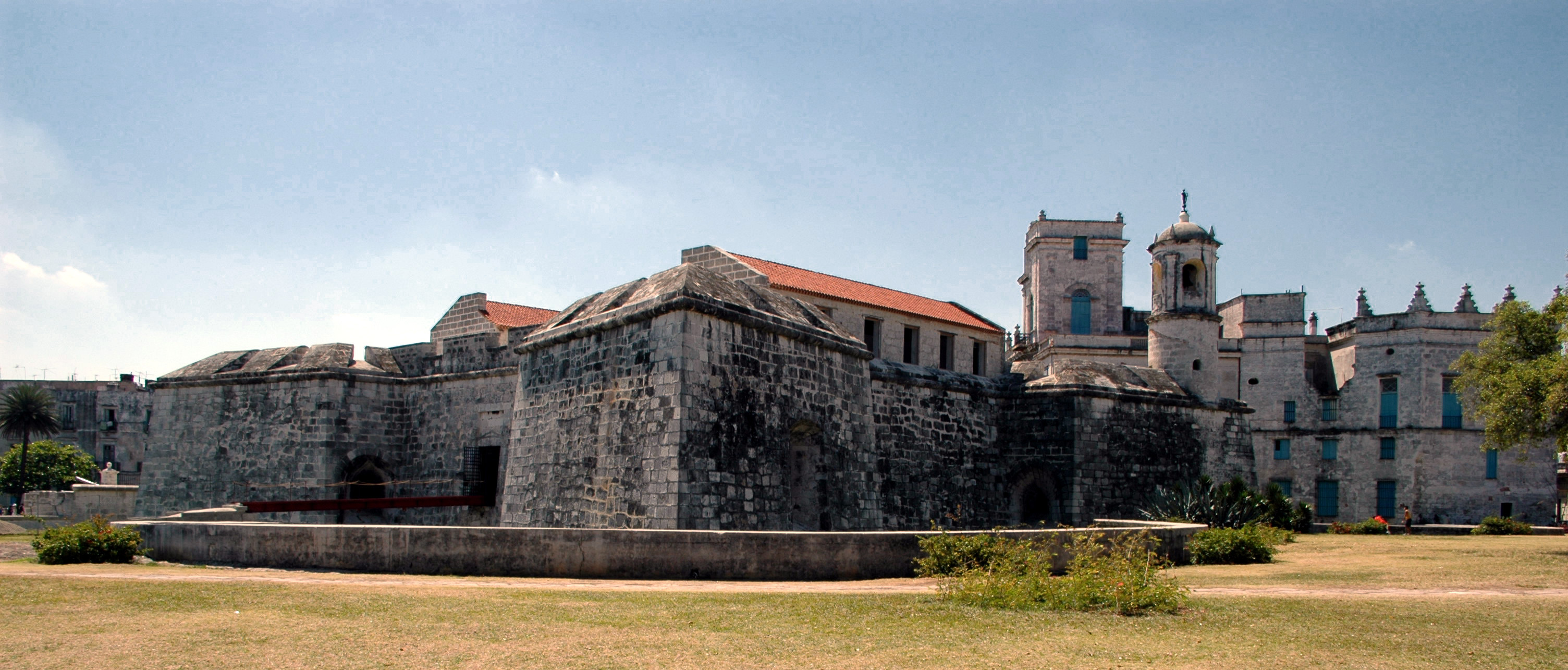
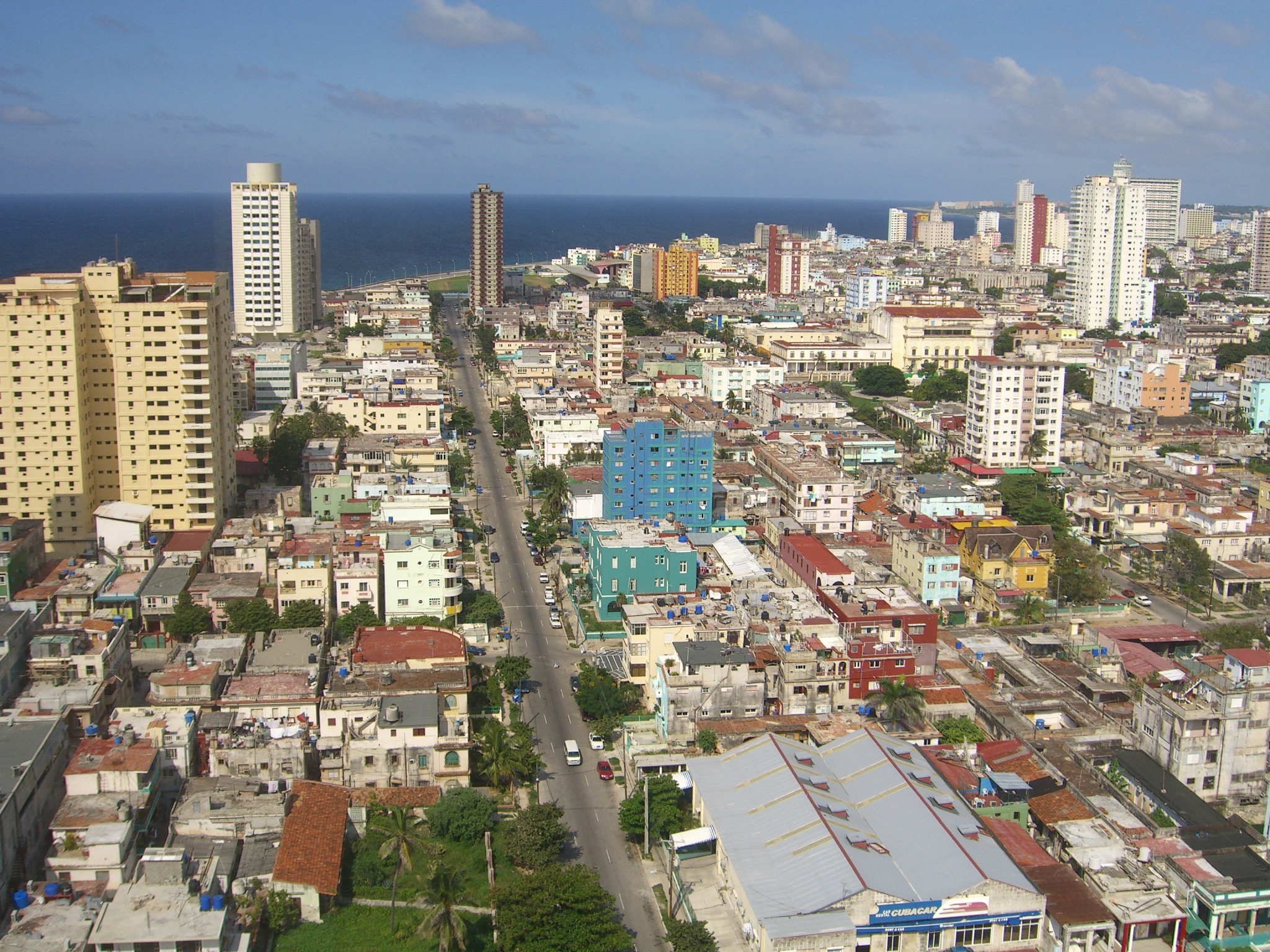
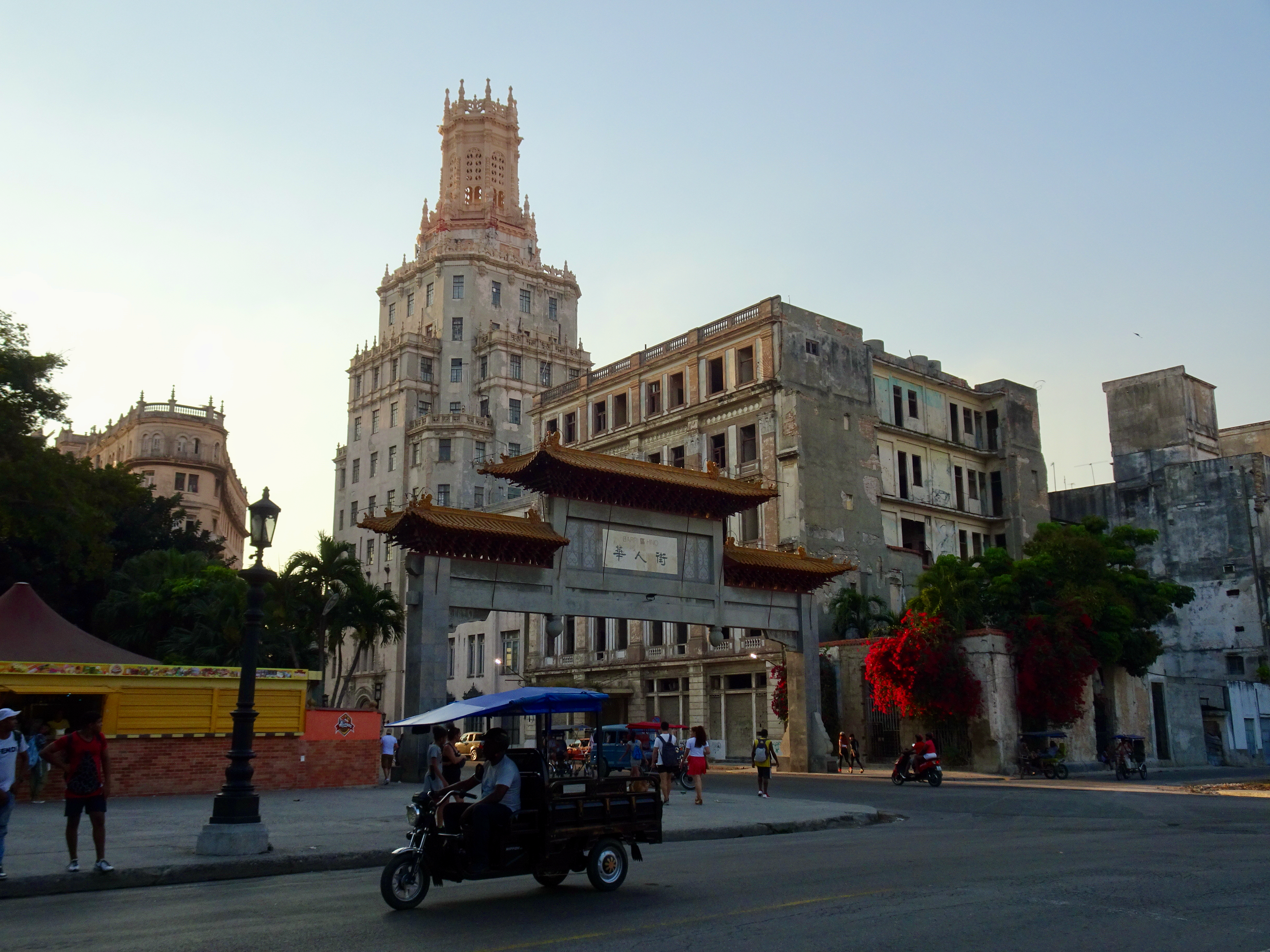
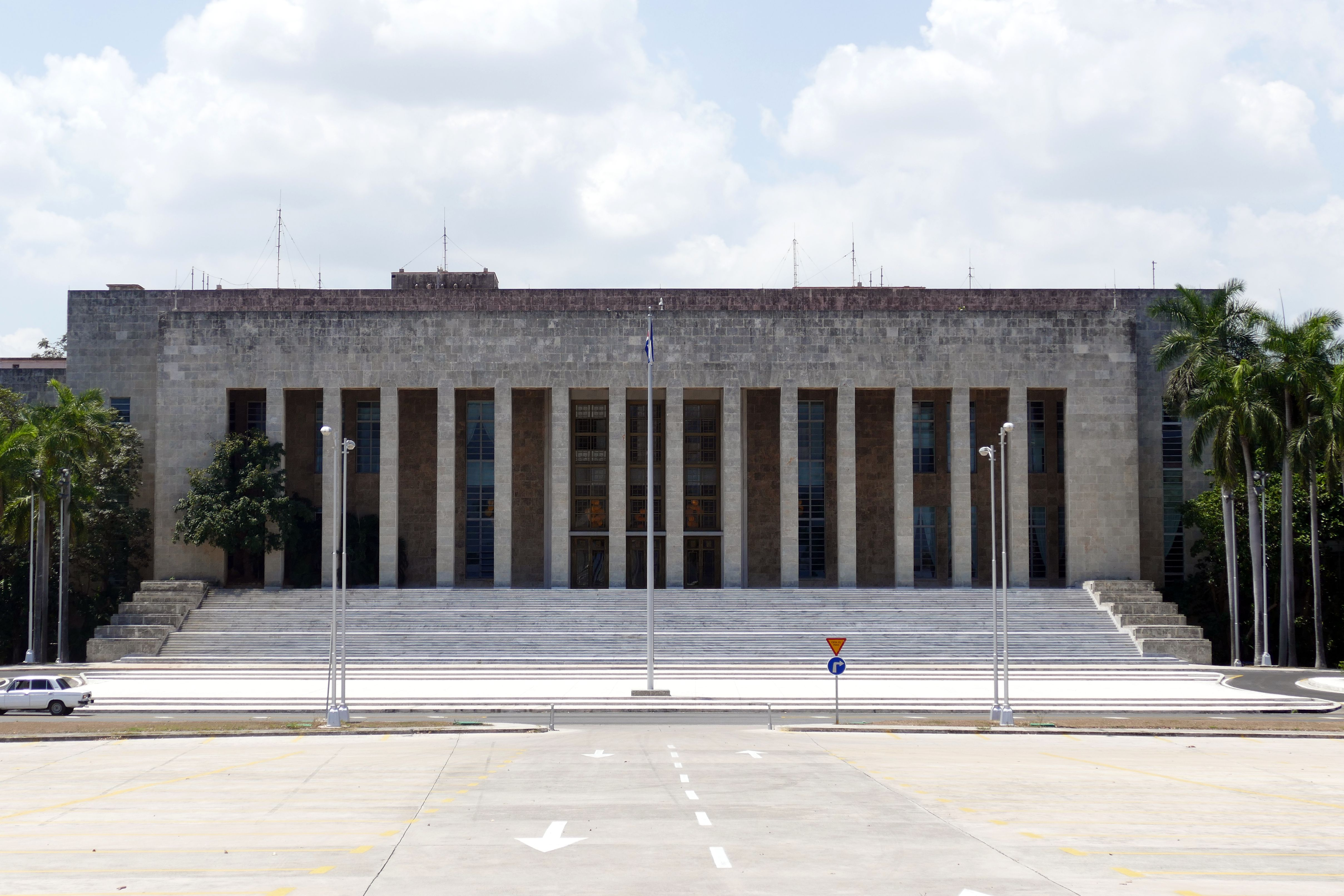
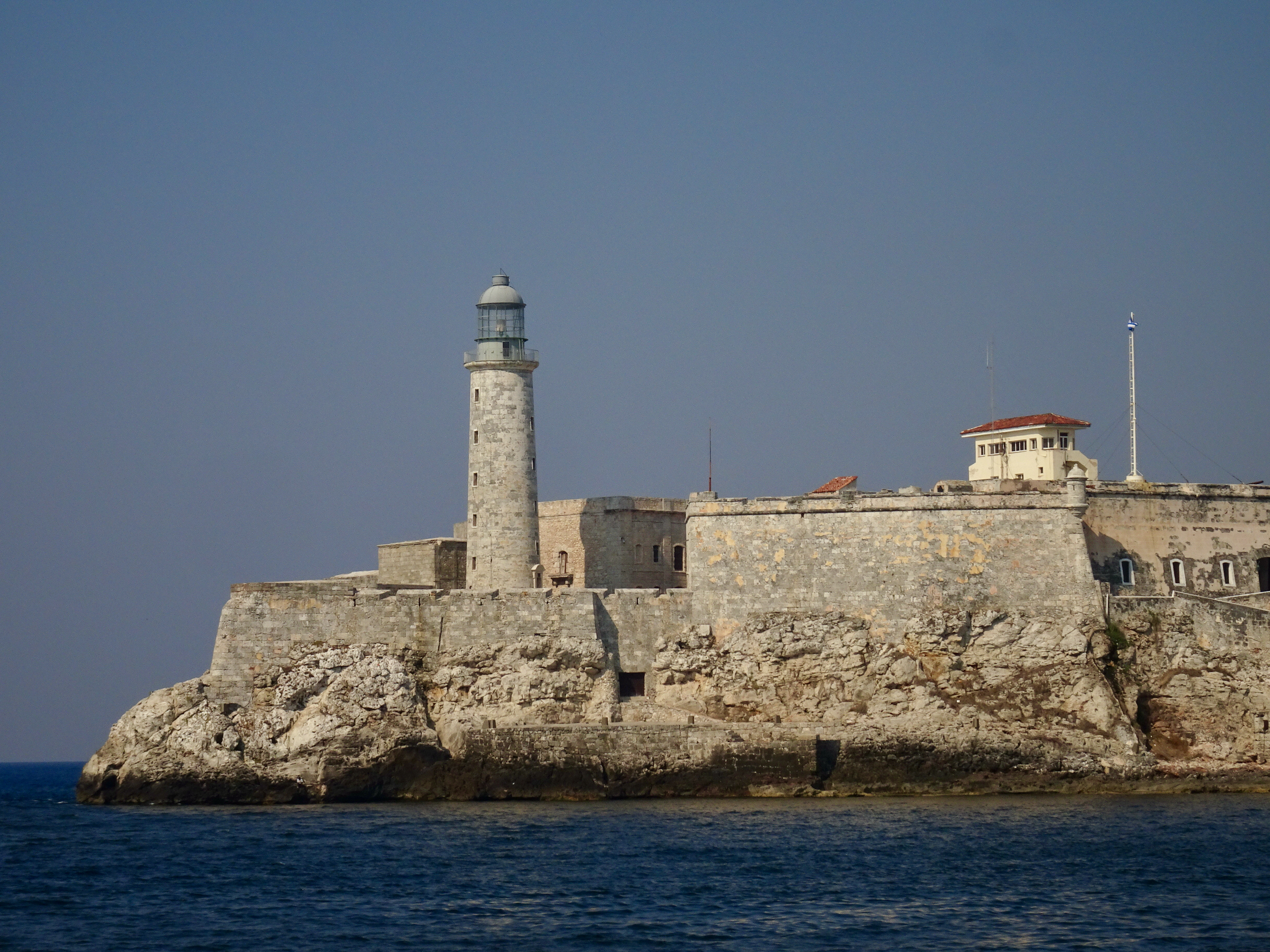
- Skyline of Malecón National Capitol of Cuba Castillo de la Real Fuerza Línea Street Barrio Chino Palace of the Revolution Castillo del Morro

- Flag Coat of arms
- Nickname: City of Columns
- Location within Cuba Location within the Caribbean Location within North America
- Coordinates: 23°08′12″N 82°21′32″W
- Country: Cuba
- Region: Western
- Province: La Habana
- Founded: 1514
- Relocated: 16 November 1519 (current location)
- Municipalities: 15

Government
  - Body: Gobierno Provincial de La Habana
  - Governor: Yanet Hernández Pérez (PCC)

Area
  - Capital city: 728.26 km^{2} (281.18 sq mi)
- Elevation: 59 m (194 ft)

Population (2022)
  - Capital city: 2,137,847
  - Rank: 8th in North America; 1st in Cuba
  - Density: 2,936/km^{2} (7,600/sq mi)
  - Urban: 2,146,237
  - Metro: 2,156,350
- Demonym(s): Habanero, -a

GDP (nominal, 2023)
  - Capital city: $21.4 billion
  - Per capita: $9,900
- Time zone: UTC−5 (UTC−05:00)
  - Summer (DST): UTC−4 (UTC−04:00)
- Patron saint: San Cristóbal
- HDI (2019): 0.834 – very high
- Website: lahabana.gob.cu

UNESCO World Heritage Site
- Official name: Old Havana and its Fortification System
- Type: Cultural
- Criteria: iv, v
- Designated: 1982 (6th session)
- Reference no.: 204
- Region: the Caribbean

Havana (/həˈvænə/ hə-VAN-ə, US also /həˈvɑːnə/ hə-VAH-nə; Spanish: La Habana [la aˈβana]) is the capital and largest city of Cuba. The heart of La Habana Province, Havana is the country's main port and commercial center. It is the most populous city, the largest by area, and the second-largest metropolitan area in the Caribbean region. The population in 2021 was 2,142,939 inhabitants, and its area is 728.26 km^{2} (281.18 sq mi) for the capital city and 8,475.57 km^{2} for the metropolitan zone. Its official population dropped to 1,749,964 inhabitants by the end of 2024.

Founded in 1519 by the Spanish Empire, Havana overtook Santiago in the mid-16th century due to the geostrategic advantages of its harbor, becoming the capital of the island in 1552. It became a fundamental place for the Spanish colonial empire in the Americas, and a stopping point for galleons returning to the Iberian Peninsula, and walls and forts were built to protect it from naval attacks. Havana is the seat of the Cuban government and ministries, the headquarters of various businesses and home to more than 100 diplomatic offices. In 2009, the city had the third-highest income in the country.

Contemporary Havana can be described as three cities in one: Old Havana, Vedado and the newer suburban districts. The city extends mostly westward and southward from the bay, which is entered through a narrow inlet and which divides into three main harbors: Marimelena, Guanabacoa and Antares. The Almendares River traverses the city from south to north, entering the Straits of Florida a few miles west of the bay.

Havana attracts over a million tourists annually, 1,276,627 international tourists in 2010, a 30% increase from 2005. Old Havana was declared a UNESCO World Heritage Site in 1982. Havana is noted for its history, culture, architecture and monuments. As typical of Cuba, Havana has a tropical climate.

== Etymology ==
In 1514, Diego Velázquez de Cuéllar founded the town of San Cristóbal de la Habana, which means 'Saint Christopher of the Habana'. It has been theorized that the name is derived from Habaguanex, the chief of a local Taíno-speaking tribe about whom little else is known.

In Spanish, the name was commonly written as Havana or Hauana, as found in historical documents. The spelling "Habana" with a "b" began to be used more frequently starting in 1798, and it became the standard form by 1821.

When Habana was adapted into English, the ⟨b⟩ was switched to a ⟨v⟩ because of a linguistic phenomenon known as betacism, which is an assimilation of the voiced bilabial plosive and voiced labiodental fricative sounds that occurs in most modern Spanish dialects. Usage of the word Havana in literature understandably peaked during the Spanish–American War, but it also represents a type of cigar, a color, and a type of rabbit as well as the city. Havana is the prevailing name for the city found in English-language dictionaries.

== History ==
=== 16th century ===
==== Beginnings ====
Diego Velázquez originally founded Havana in 1514, on the opposite coast, 69 km (43 mi) south of its current location. An early map of Cuba drawn in 1514 places it at the mouth of the Mayabeque River, now the town of Batabanó. This settlement failed, primarily due to the low and swampy nature of the land around the river. All attempts by the Spanish to establish a settlement in this area ultimately failed.

Between 1514 and 1519, the Spanish established the first settlements on the northern coast of Cuba near present-day Havana. One of them was called La Chorrera, on the current site of the Tower of La Chorrera, next to the mouth of the Almendares River. This settlement was in a better location than the first on the southern coast, as the surrounding land was at a higher elevation and the landscape was less marshy. La Chorrera eventually became the neighborhoods of Vedado and Miramar.

The town that became Havana originated adjacent to what was then called Puerto de Carenas (literally, 'Careening Port'), in 1519. The quality of the Havana Harbor and its surrounding bay is what led to its change of location.

Pánfilo de Narváez gave Havana – the sixth town founded in Cuba – its name: San Cristóbal de la Habana. San Cristóbal is the patron saint of Havana. The first cities founded on the island served as little more than bases for the conquista of other lands.

==== Attacks ====
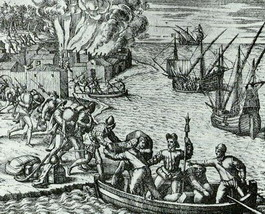
French pirate Jacques de Sores looting and burning Havana in 1555

As Havana began as a trading port in the Caribbean, it suffered regular attacks by buccaneers, pirates, and French corsairs. The first attack and resultant burning of the city was by the French corsair Jacques de Sores in 1555. Such attacks convinced the Spanish Crown to fund the construction of the first fortresses in the main cities – not only to counteract the pirates and corsairs, but also to exert more control over commerce in the West Indies and to limit the extensive contrabando (smuggling) that had arisen due to the trade restrictions imposed by the Casa de Contratación of Seville (the crown-controlled trading house that held a monopoly on trade in the New World).

Ships from all over the New World carried products first to Havana, to be taken by the fleet to Spain. The thousands of ships that gathered in the city's bay fueled Havana's agriculture and manufacturing industries, since they had to be supplied with food, water, and other products needed to traverse the ocean.

On 20 December 1592, King Philip II of Spain granted Havana the title of City. Later on, the city would be officially designated as "Key to the New World and Rampart of the West Indies" by the Spanish Crown. In the meantime, efforts to build or improve the defensive infrastructure of the city continued.

=== 17th century ===
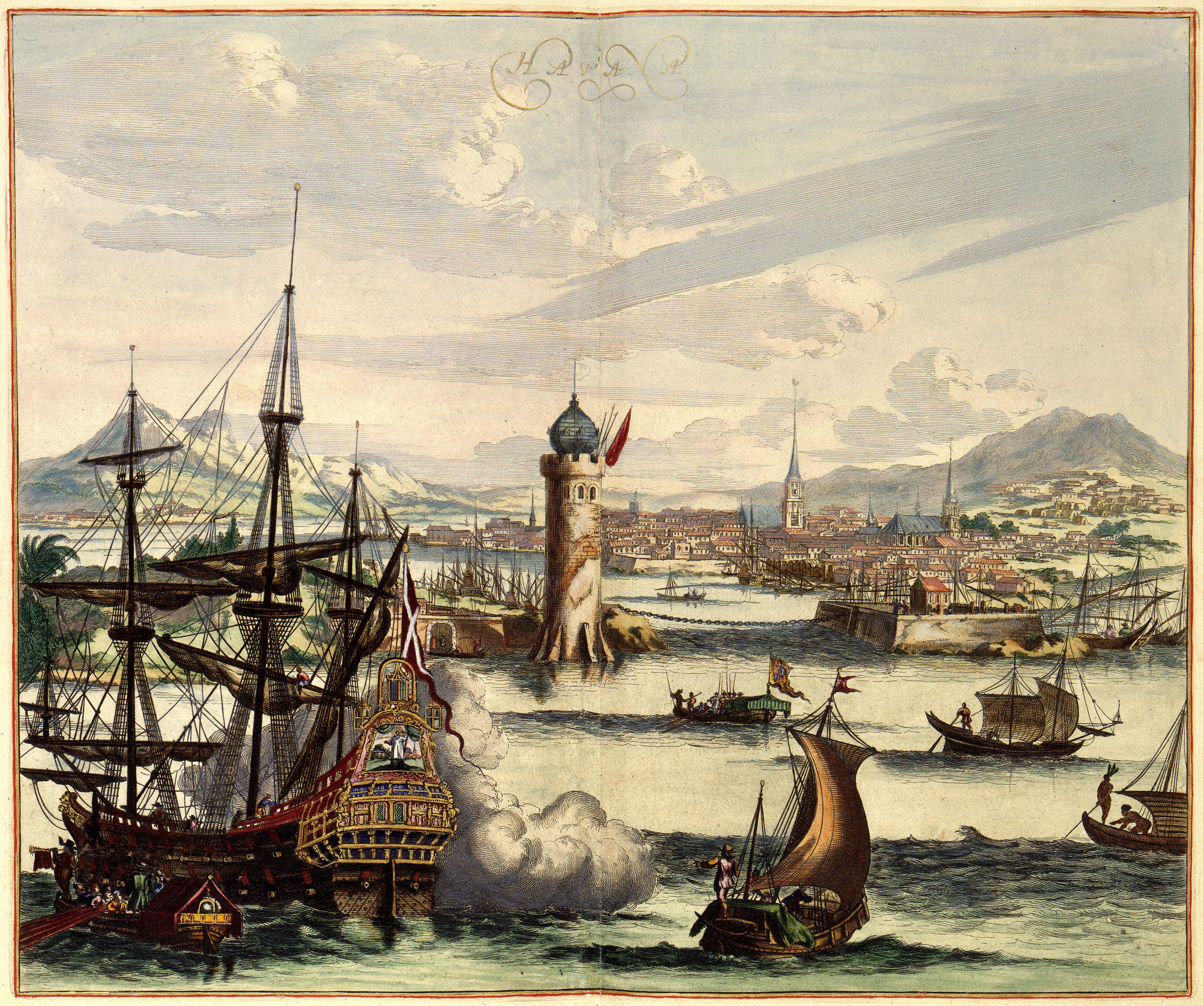
Havana in 1690, according to the Atlas Van der Hagen. British Library.

Havana expanded greatly during the 17th century. New buildings were constructed from the most abundant materials of the island, primarily wood, combining various Iberian architectural styles as well as borrowing extensively from Canarian characteristics. During this period, the city built many civic monuments and religious buildings, including the El Morro Castle, Convent of St Augustin, the Chapel of the Humilladero, the Fountain of Dorotea de la Lunin La Chorrera, the Church of the Holy Angel, the Hospital de San Lázaro, the Monastery of Santa Teresa, and the Convent of San Felipe Neri.

In 1649, a fatal yellow fever epidemic brought from Cartagena killed a third of the population in Havana. In 1674, construction of the city walls started as part of the fortification efforts. It would be completed by 1740.

=== 18th century ===
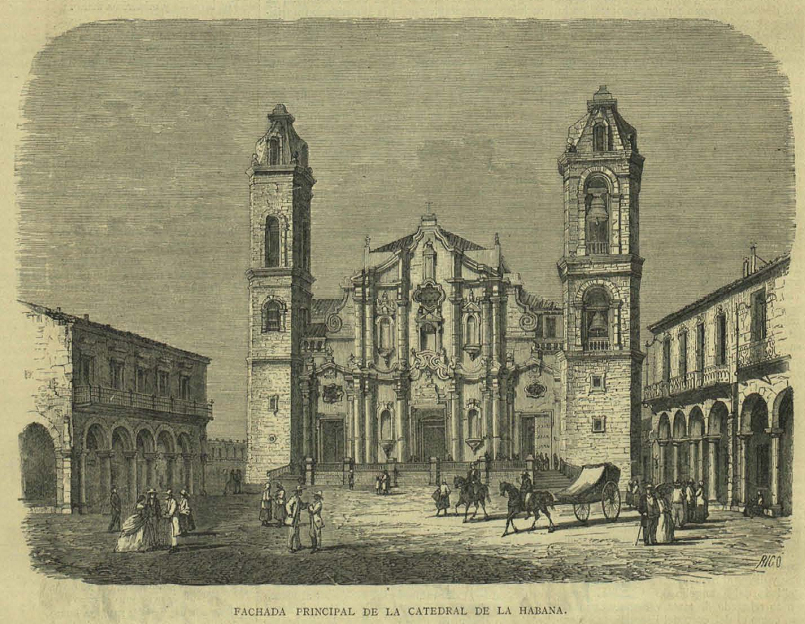
Havana Cathedral, 1748–1777

By the middle of the 18th century, Havana had more than seventy thousand inhabitants, making it the third-largest city in the Americas, ranking behind Lima and Mexico City but ahead of Boston and New York City.

During this time, Havana was the most important port in the Spanish West Indies, as it had facilities where ships could be refitted before continuing their voyage. By 1740, it had become Spain's largest and most active shipyard and the only drydock in the New World.

==== Seven Years' War ====
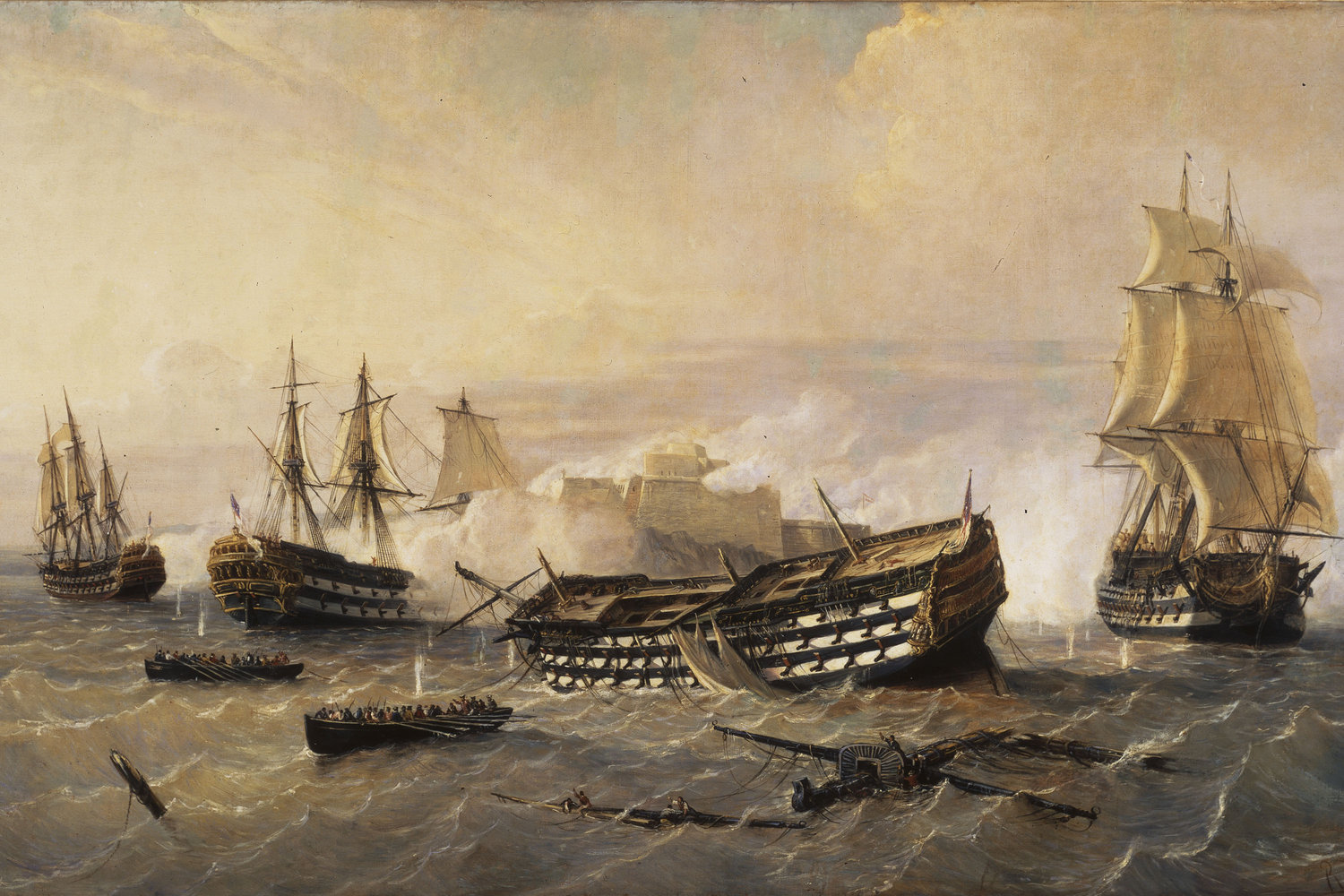
The British fleet entering Havana

The city was sieged by the British during the Siege of Havana in the Seven Years' War. The episode began on 6 June 1762, when at dawn, a British fleet comprising more than 50 ships and a combined force of over 11,000 men of the Royal Navy and Army, sailed into Cuban waters and made an amphibious landing east of Havana.

After the siege, the British immediately opened up Havana to trade with their North American and Caribbean colonies, causing a rapid transformation of Cuban society. Less than a year after Havana was seized, the Treaty of Paris was signed in 1763 by the three warring powers, ending the war. The treaty ceded Spanish Florida to the British in exchange for the return of Havana to Spain.

After regaining the city, the Spanish transformed Havana into the most heavily fortified city in the Americas; similar to Cartagena, a city that under the leadership of Blas de Lezo defeated a British invasion of 30,000 sailors during the Battle of Cartagena in 1741. Construction began on what was to become the Fortress of San Carlos de la Cabaña, the third biggest Spanish fortification in the New World after Castillo San Cristóbal and Castillo San Felipe del Morro, both located in San Juan, Puerto Rico.

On 15 January 1796, the remains of Christopher Columbus were transported to Cuba from Santo Domingo. They rested there until 1898, when they were transferred to the Seville Cathedral after Spain's loss of Cuba in the Spanish-American War.

=== 19th century ===
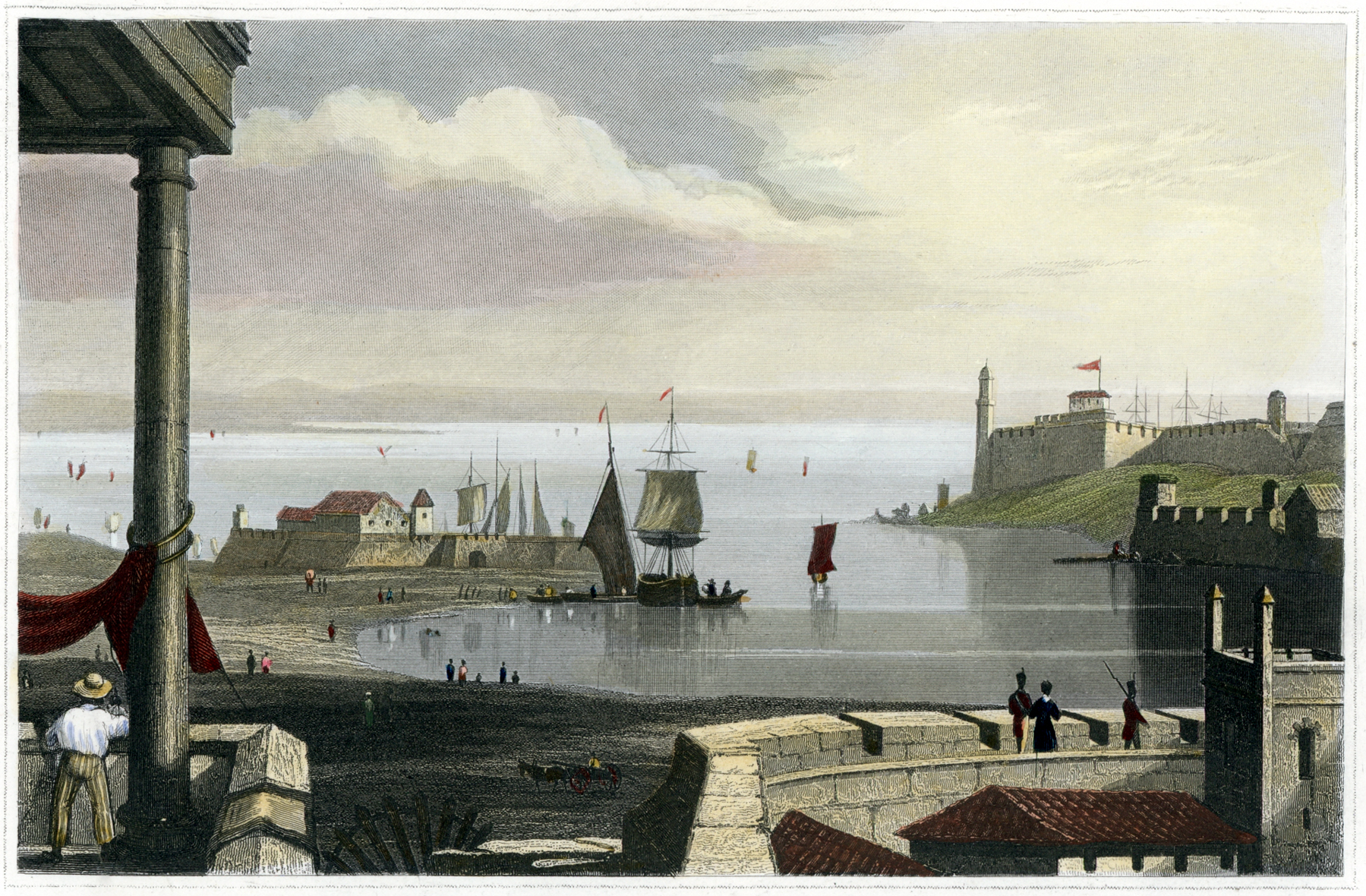
The entrance to Havana Harbor in 1841, by Bibliographisches Institut for Meyer's Universum

As trade between the Caribbean and North America increased in the early 19th century, Havana became a flourishing city. Havana's theaters featured the most distinguished actors of the day, and prosperity among the burgeoning middle-class led to expensive new classical mansions being erected. During this period, Havana became known as the "Paris of the Antilles".

In 1837, the first railroad in the country was constructed in Havana, a 51 km (32 mi) stretch between Havana and Bejucal, which was used to transport sugar from the valley of Güines to the port of Havana. With this, Cuba became the seventh country in the world to have a railroad, and the first Latin American and Spanish-speaking country to do so.

Throughout the century, Havana continued constructing additional cultural facilities, such as the Tacón Theatre, which later became the Gran Teatro de La Habana. In 1863, the city walls were knocked down so that the city could be expanded.

Slavery in Cuba was legal until 1886, leading to interest from slavers in the American South who were looking for ways to preserve a slave state. The Knights of the Golden Circle proposed a 1200 mile-radius 'Golden Circle' where slavery would still be permitted. The circle would be centered on Havana and encompass much of North America.

After the Confederate States of America were defeated in the American Civil War in 1865, many former slaveholders fled to Havana on ships, including Confederate Secretary of State Judah P. Benjamin and Vice President and Confederate Secretary of War John C. Breckinridge. Many refugees stayed in Cuba until Andrew Johnson granted amnesty to former Confederates in 1868.

==== Cuban independence ====
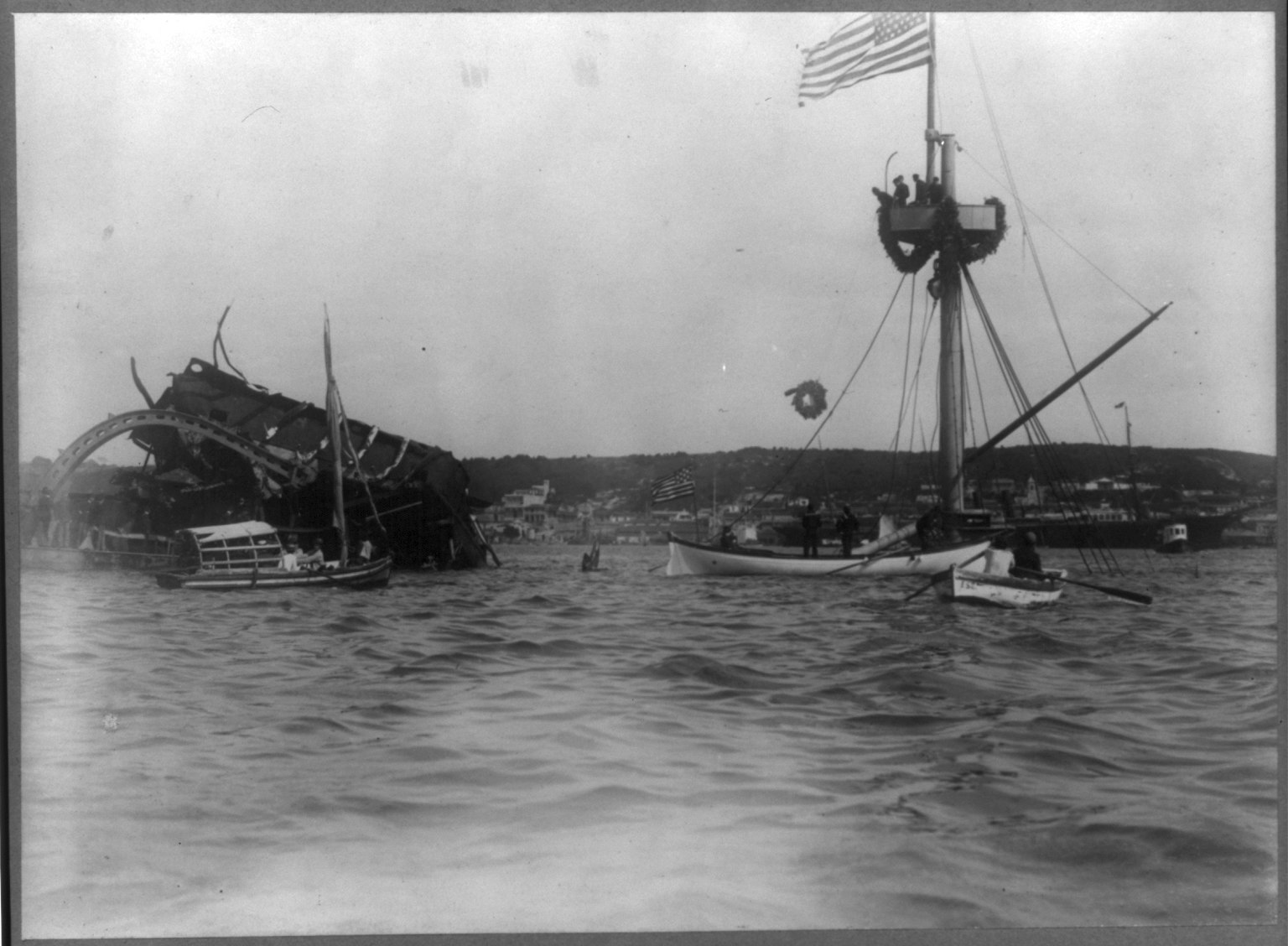
The sinking of USS Maine in Havana Harbor

The sinking of the USS Maine battleship in the Havana Harbor was the immediate cause of the Spanish–American War. In Cuba, the war was the culmination of its war of independence with Spain, which was already underway for three years. On 12 August 1898, Spain relinquished sovereignty over Cuba, thus ending Spanish presence in the Americas.

=== 20th century ===
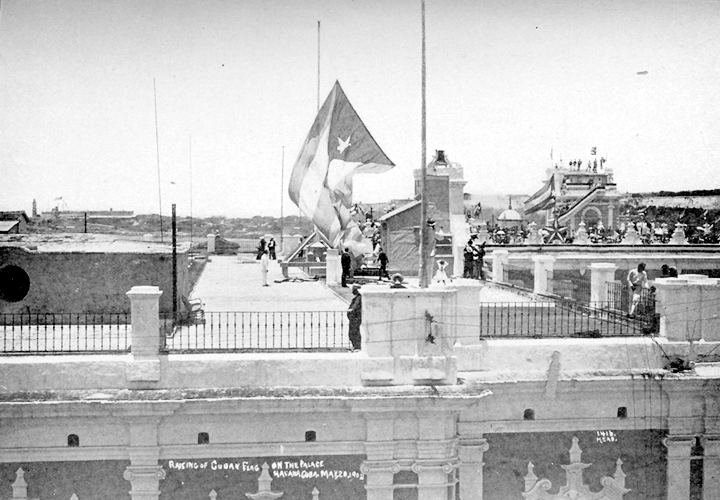
Raising the Cuban flag on the Governor General's Palace at noon on 20 May 1902

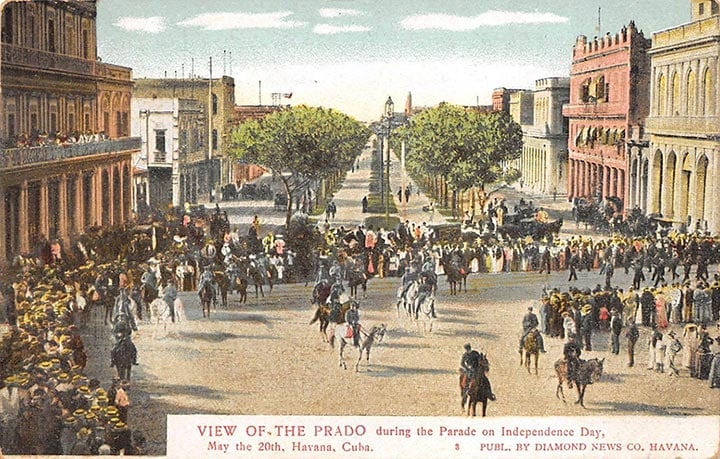
Paseo del Prado, Havana in 1909

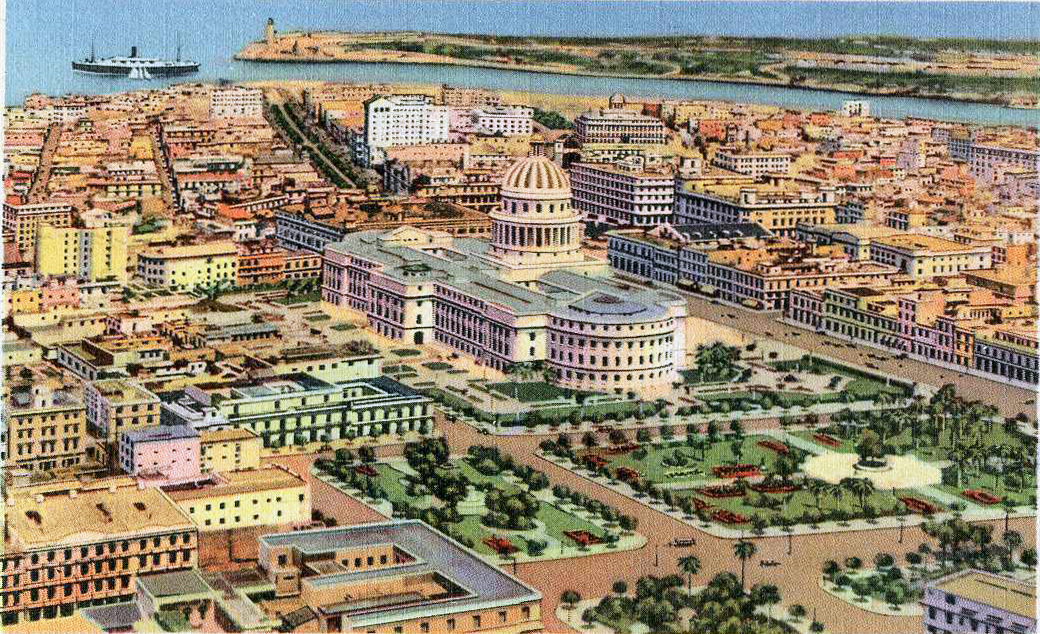
El Capitolio in 1933, photomechanical print (postcard)

==== Republican era ====
Havana became the capital of the newly independent Republic of Cuba in 1902. The city held the inauguration of Cuba's first president, Tomás Estrada Palma, who was considered to have upheld the highest standards of administrative integrity during the time of the Republic.

In July 1940, during World War II, Cuba hosted the Havana Conference, where representatives from the U.S. and 20 other countries in Latin America met in Havana and agreed to a policy of defending European-owned colonies and dependencies in North and South America, if the host country fell to the Axis powers.

In 1958, Cuba was a relatively wealthy country by Latin American standards, and in some cases even by world standards. It had the third-highest GDP per capita in Latin America in the late 1950s, surpassed by only Venezuela and Uruguay.

Cuba implemented perhaps some of the largest labor protection laws for workers in the Americas, including bans on dismissal and protection against mechanization. These were obtained in large part "at the cost of the unemployed and the peasants", leading to economic disparities. Between 1933 and 1958, Cuba significantly expanded economic regulations, causing further problems.

Unemployment became an issue as graduates entering the workforce could not find jobs. The middle class, which was then comparable to that of the United States in terms of wealth, became increasingly dissatisfied with unemployment and political persecution, yet labor unions continued supporting Batista until the very end.

Although Cuba had the highest ratio of hospital beds to people in the Caribbean (88 beds for every 300 people), around 80% of them were in Havana. Outside the capital, there was only one rural hospital, equipped with 10 beds. Prostitution in Cuba grew significantly during the first half of the 20th century, and was mainly centered in Havana. The number of prostitutes in the city grew from 4,000 in 1912 to over 11,000 in the late 1950s, earning the city a reputation.

==== Post-revolution ====
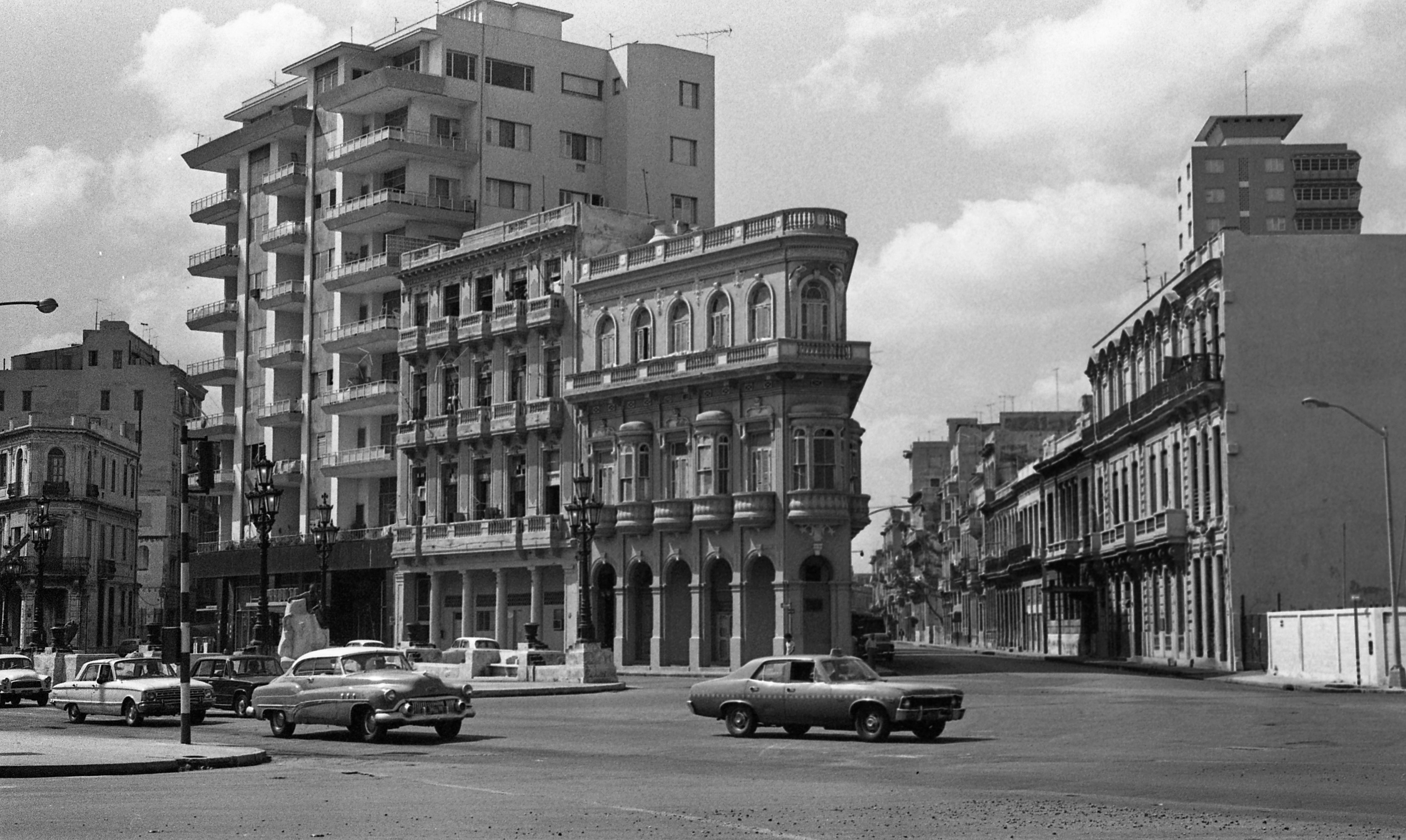
Paseo de Martí in 1978

After the Cuban Revolution in 1959, the new revolutionary government under Fidel Castro began to improve social services, public housing, and official buildings. Nevertheless, Castro's abrupt expropriation of all private property and industry (under a Marxist-Leninist model), followed by the U.S. embargo against Cuba in 1960, led to shortages that hit Cuba and Havana hard.

By 1966–68, the Cuban government had nationalized all privately owned business entities in Cuba, down to "certain kinds of small retail forms of commerce" as per law No. 1076.

An economic downturn occurred after the collapse of the Soviet Union in 1991. The two countries had close relations, and when Soviet subsidies ended, billions of dollars that Cuba was receiving from the Soviet Union were lost. Many believed the revolutionary government would soon collapse, as happened to the Soviet satellite states in Eastern Europe.

=== 21st century ===
Tourism in Cuba has brought foreign investors to remodel the nationalized Manzana de Gómez building and turn it into the Gran Hotel Manzana Kempinski La Habana, a 5-star hotel, showing efforts to develop the city's hospitality industry. In Old Havana, a number of streets and squares have been rehabilitated in an effort to attract more tourism.

On the night of 27 January 2019, an unusually violent and destructive tornado ripped through Havana. The tornado killed eight people and injured over 190. It was assigned an official rating of EF4 on the Enhanced Fujita scale by the Cuban Meteorology Institute, making this the first F4 or EF4 tornado in Cuba since 1940.

== Administration ==
=== Governorate (1550 - 1601) ===
The Havana City Council was first created in 1550, during the Governorate of Cuba.

In 1557, the Council voted to ban all freed black men from owning taverns, inns, and selling tobacco or wine.

=== Captaincy General (1607 - 1898) ===
Under the Captaincy General of Cuba, the Havana City Council existed.

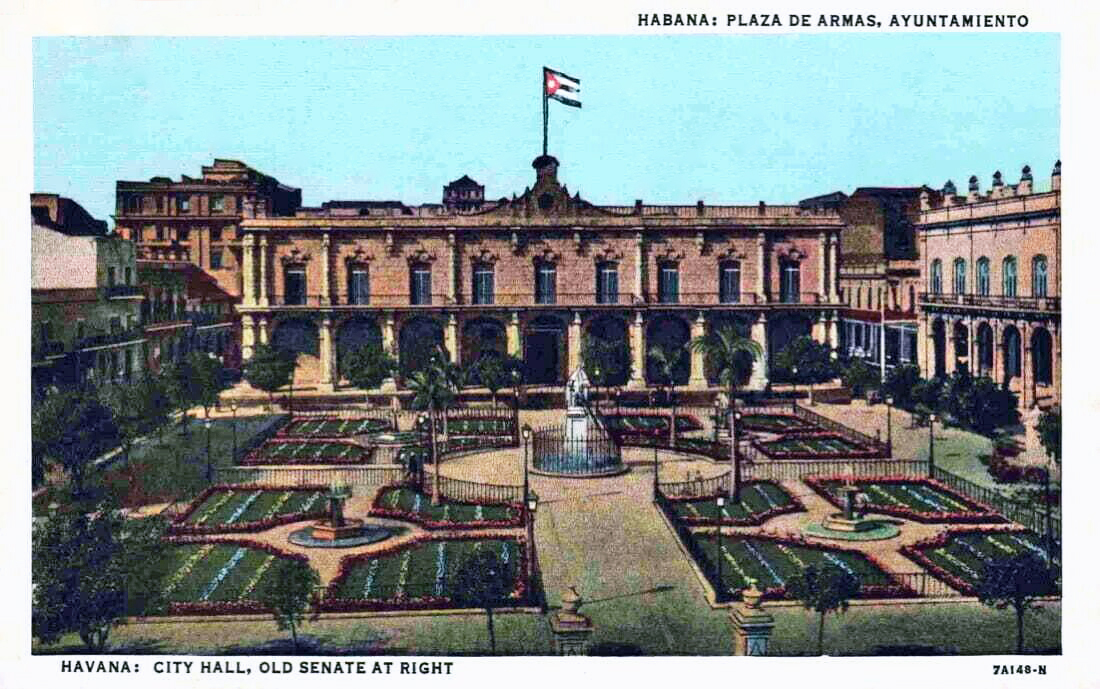
City Hall and "Plaza de Armas", 1937

=== Republic of Cuba (1901 - 1959) ===
After the Cuban War of Independence, Cuba created a new constitution in 1901. The Havana City Council was re-inaugurated on July 2, 1901. Alfredo Zayas was briefly appointed mayor, followed by the installment of Miguel Gener y Rincón, the acting Secretary of Justice of Cuba, after winning the 1900 Cuban local elections.

In 1902, pending an investigation by Emilio Núñez, Gener was removed as mayor of Havana by Leonard Wood, after a vote of twenty-three out of twenty-five members of the City Council requested him to do so.

=== Modern republic ===
After the Cuban Revolution in 1959, the municipal government of Habana was restructured as part of a broader restructuring of the Cuban state by the revolutionary government.

The 1976 constitution which established the National Assembly of People's Power centralized political authority and changed the government of Havana again. The constitution granted Havana both city (Havana city) and provincial (Habana Province) status, thus Havana functions as both a city and province of Cuba. It is administered by a city-provincial council with a governor as the chief officer. The current governor is Yanet Hernández Pérez, she was elected on 28 May 2023.

The city has little autonomy and is dependent upon the national government, particularly for much of its budgetary constraints and political direction.

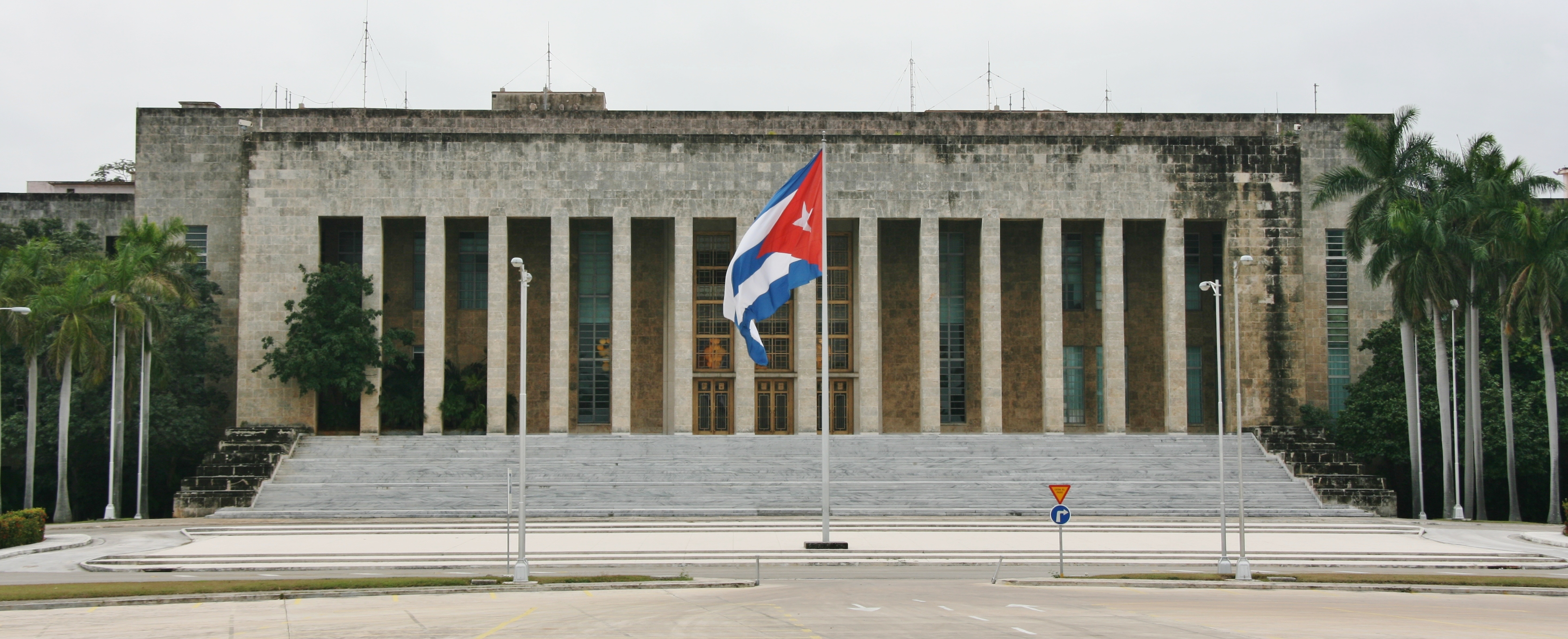
The Comite Central del Partido Comunista de Cuba (Central Committee of the Cuban Communist Party)

Voters elect delegates to Municipal Assemblies in competitive elections every five years, and the Municipal Assemblies are responsible for each of the city's boroughs. These assemblies elect the borough presidents and vice presidents, which are equivalents to mayors and vice mayors in the other provinces. There is only one political party, the Communist Party, but since there must be a minimum of two candidates, members of the Communist Party often run against each other.

Candidates are not required to be members of the party. They are nominated directly by citizens in open meetings within each election district. Municipal Assembly delegates within the boroughs in turn elect members of the Provincial Council (until 2019 the Provincial Assembly), which in Havana serves roughly as the City Council; its president appoints the Governor and Vice Governor, who serve as the Mayor and Vice Mayor of Havana and can be either elected by the council or appointed by the president with council confirmation. There are direct elections for the city's deputies to the National Assembly based on slates, and a portion of the candidates is nominated at the local level.

The People's Councils (Consejos Populares) consist of local city delegates who elect a full-time representative to preside over the body. These councils are directly responsible for the city's neighbourhoods and wards. There is involvement of "mass organizations" and representatives of local government agencies, industries and services. The 105 People's Councils in Havana cover an average of 20,000 residents each.

The former province of La Habana (Habana Campo) was separated into Artemisa and Mayabeque Province in 2010. Mayabeque forms the border on the south and east, and Artemisa on the west.

== Geography ==
=== Location ===
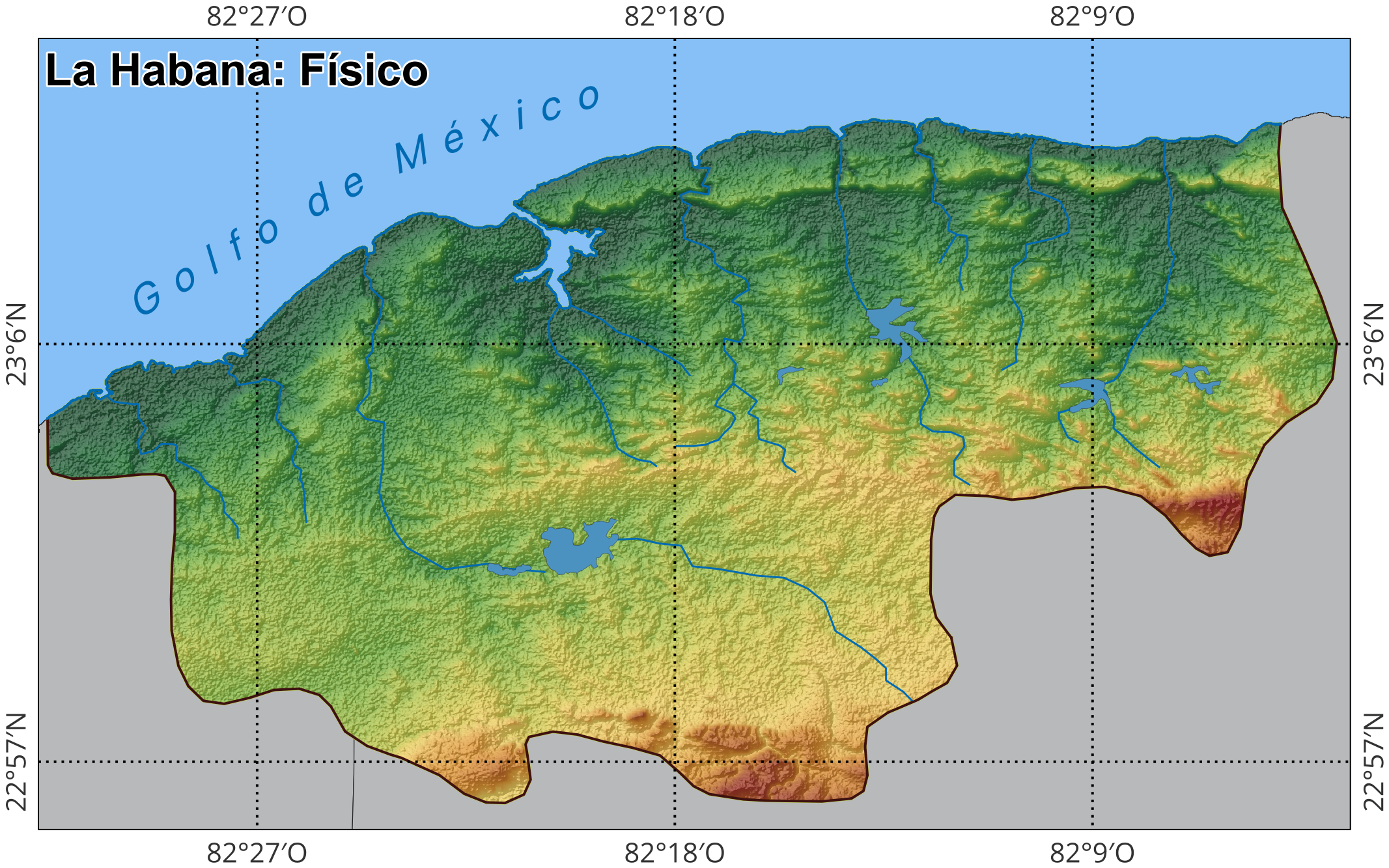
A topographic map of Havana

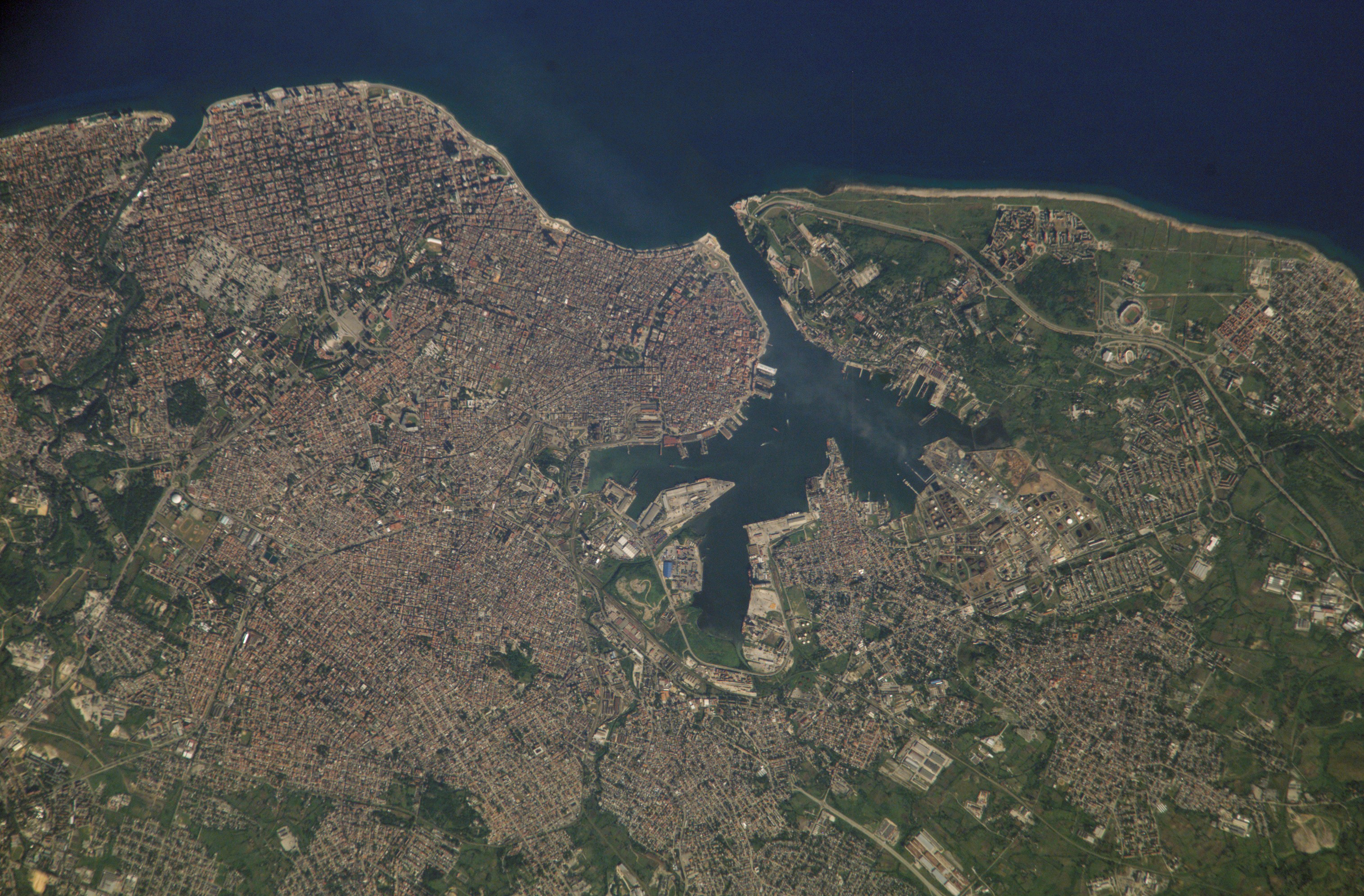
A satellite view of Havana in October 2005

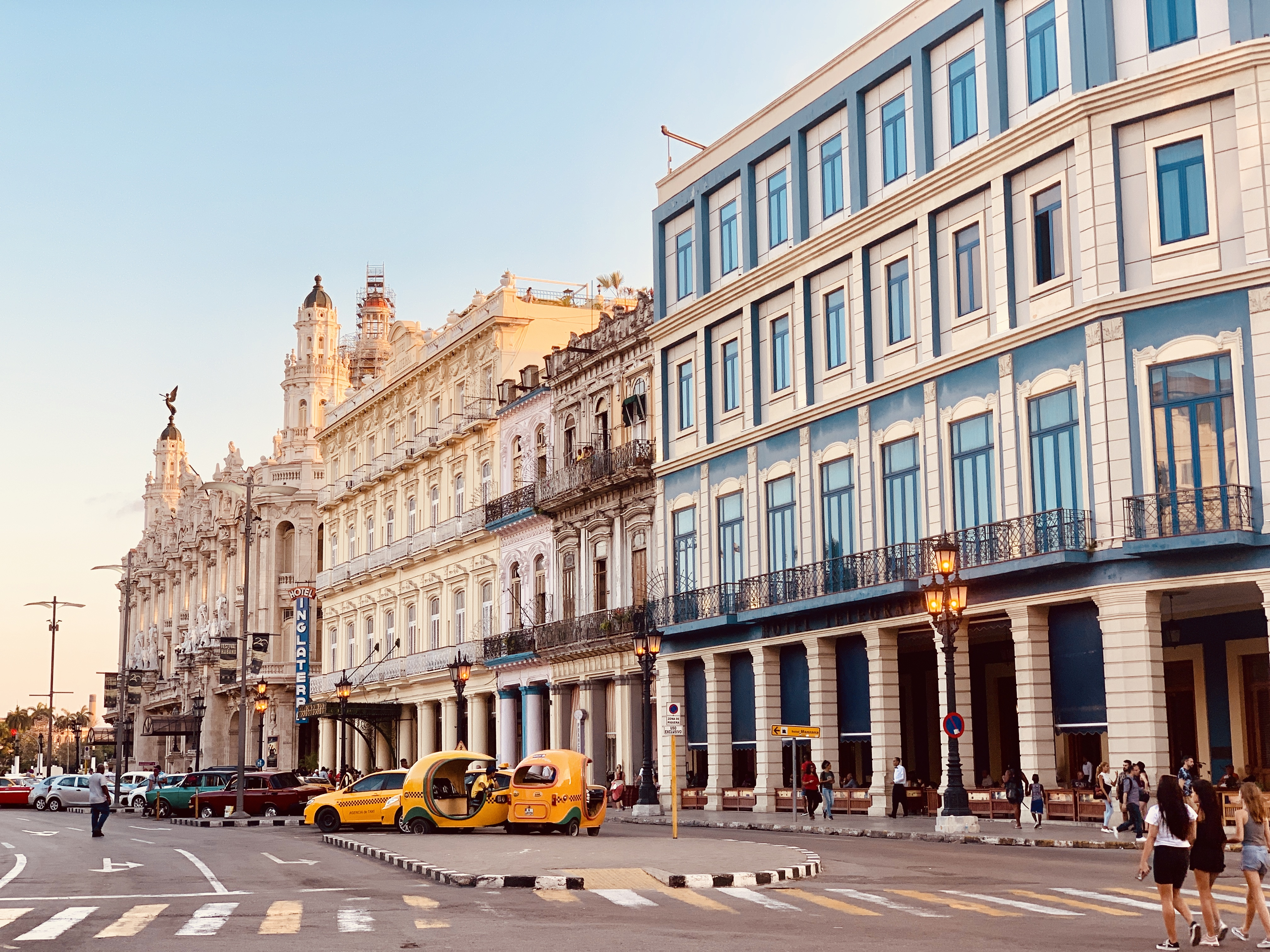
Paseo del Prado, Havana in April 2019

Havana lies on the northern coast of Cuba along the Straits of Florida, south of the Florida Keys, where the Gulf of Mexico joins the Atlantic Ocean. The city extends mostly westward and southward from the bay, which is entered through a narrow inlet and which divides into three main harbors: Marimelena, Guanabacoa, and Atarés. The Almendares River traverses the city from south to north, entering the Straits of Florida a few miles west of the bay.

The city is mostly located on low hills that rise gently from the Florida Strait. A noteworthy elevation is the 200-foot-high (60-meter) limestone ridge that slopes up from the east and culminates in the heights of La Cabaña and El Morro, the sites of Spanish fortifications overlooking the eastern bay. Another notable rise is the hill to the west that is occupied by the University of Havana and the Castillo del Príncipe (Havana).

=== Climate ===
Havana has a tropical climate that is tempered by the island's position in the belt of the trade winds and by the warm offshore currents. Under the Köppen climate classification, Havana has a tropical savanna climate (Aw) that closely borders on a tropical rainforest climate (Af) and a tropical monsoon climate (Am). Average temperatures range from 22 °C (72 °F) in January and February to 28 °C (82 °F) in August. The temperature seldom drops below 10 °C (50 °F). The lowest temperature was 1 °C (34 °F) in Santiago de Las Vegas, Boyeros. The lowest recorded temperature in Cuba was 0 °C (32 °F) in Bainoa, Mayabeque Province (before 2011 the eastern part of Havana province). Rainfall is heaviest in June and October and lightest from December through April, averaging 1,200 mm (47 in) annually. Hurricanes occasionally strike the island, but they ordinarily hit the south coast, and damage in Havana has been less than elsewhere in the country. The most recent tropical cyclone to come near Havana at hurricane strength was Ian in 2022.

Tornadoes can be somewhat rare in Cuba. On the evening of 28 January 2019, a very rare strong EF4 tornado struck the eastern side of Havana. The tornado caused extensive damage, destroying at least 90 homes, killing 8 people and injuring 195.

The table lists temperature averages:

Climate data for Havana (Havana Province, Casa Blanca Station) 1991–2020 normals, extremes 1859–present)
Month	Jan	Feb	Mar	Apr	May	Jun	Jul	Aug	Sep	Oct	Nov	Dec	Year
Record high °C (°F)	33.0 (91.4)	34.5 (94.1)	35.3 (95.5)	37.0 (98.6)	37.3 (99.1)	35.4 (95.7)	36.6 (97.9)	37.7 (99.9)	38.2 (100.8)	39.6 (103.3)	34.0 (93.2)	33.2 (91.8)	39.6 (103.3)
Mean daily maximum °C (°F)	26.5 (79.7)	27.2 (81.0)	28.5 (83.3)	29.8 (85.6)	30.8 (87.4)	31.6 (88.9)	32.3 (90.1)	32.4 (90.3)	31.8 (89.2)	30.5 (86.9)	28.6 (83.5)	27.2 (81.0)	29.8 (85.6)
Daily mean °C (°F)	22.2 (72.0)	22.4 (72.3)	23.7 (74.7)	24.8 (76.6)	26.1 (79.0)	27.0 (80.6)	27.6 (81.7)	27.9 (82.2)	27.4 (81.3)	26.1 (79.0)	24.5 (76.1)	23.0 (73.4)	25.2 (77.4)
Mean daily minimum °C (°F)	19.3 (66.7)	19.4 (66.9)	20.3 (68.5)	21.6 (70.9)	23.0 (73.4)	24.1 (75.4)	24.4 (75.9)	24.5 (76.1)	24.1 (75.4)	23.4 (74.1)	21.8 (71.2)	20.3 (68.5)	22.2 (72.0)
Record low °C (°F)	6.0 (42.8)	11.9 (53.4)	10.0 (50.0)	15.1 (59.2)	15.4 (59.7)	20.0 (68.0)	19.0 (66.2)	20.0 (68.0)	20.0 (68.0)	18.0 (64.4)	14.0 (57.2)	10.0 (50.0)	6.0 (42.8)
Average rainfall mm (inches)	56.4 (2.22)	58.7 (2.31)	53.6 (2.11)	58.4 (2.30)	120.3 (4.74)	168.1 (6.62)	125.4 (4.94)	145.2 (5.72)	175.7 (6.92)	140.3 (5.52)	82.5 (3.25)	57.6 (2.27)	1,242.2 (48.92)
Average rainy days (≥ 1.0 mm)	6.4	5.8	5.1	5.3	8.9	12.6	11.4	12.3	14.1	11.8	7.7	6.5	107.9
Average relative humidity (%)	78	77	76	74	76	79	79	79	81	80	79	79	78
Mean monthly sunshine hours	217.0	203.4	272.8	273.0	260.4	237.0	272.8	260.4	225.0	195.3	219.0	195.3	2,831.4
Mean daily sunshine hours	7.0	7.2	8.8	9.1	8.4	7.9	8.8	8.4	7.5	6.3	7.3	6.3	7.8
Average ultraviolet index	6	7	9	11	12	12	12	12	11	9	7	6	10
Source 1: World Meteorological Organisation, Climate-Charts.com
Source 2: Meteo Climat (record highs and lows), Deutscher Wetterdienst (sun)

Average Sea Temperature
Jan	Feb	Mar	Apr	May	Jun	Jul	Aug	Sep	Oct	Nov	Dec
23 °C (73 °F)	23 °C (73 °F)	24 °C (75 °F)	26 °C (79 °F)	27 °C (81 °F)	28 °C (82 °F)	28 °C (82 °F)	28 °C (82 °F)	28 °C (82 °F)	27 °C (81 °F)	26 °C (79 °F)	24 °C (75 °F)

=== Municipalities ===
The city is divided into 15 municipalities – or boroughs, which are further subdivided into 105 consejos populares (wards)

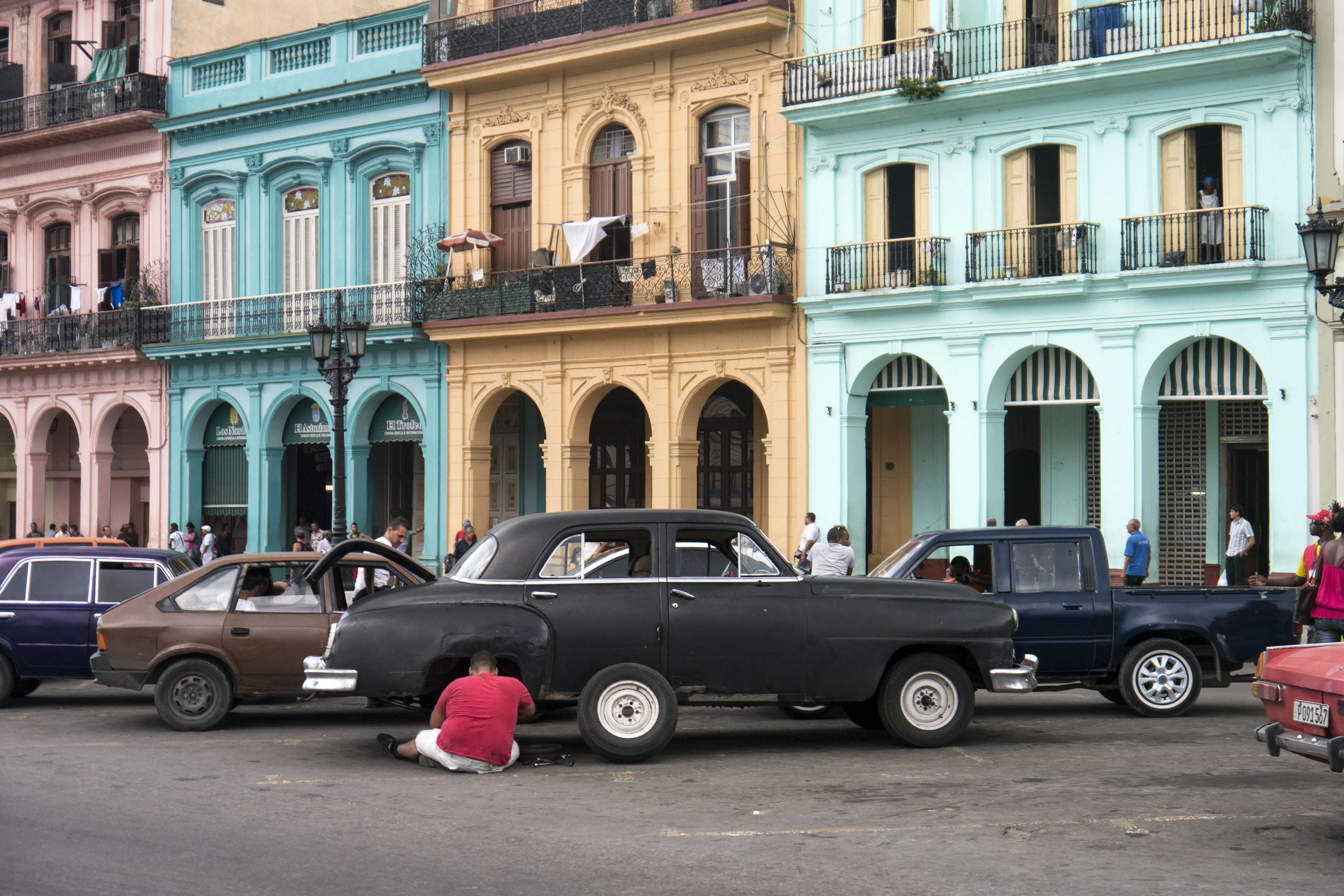
These preserved colorful Spanish Colonial era buildings are a sight common across Havana.

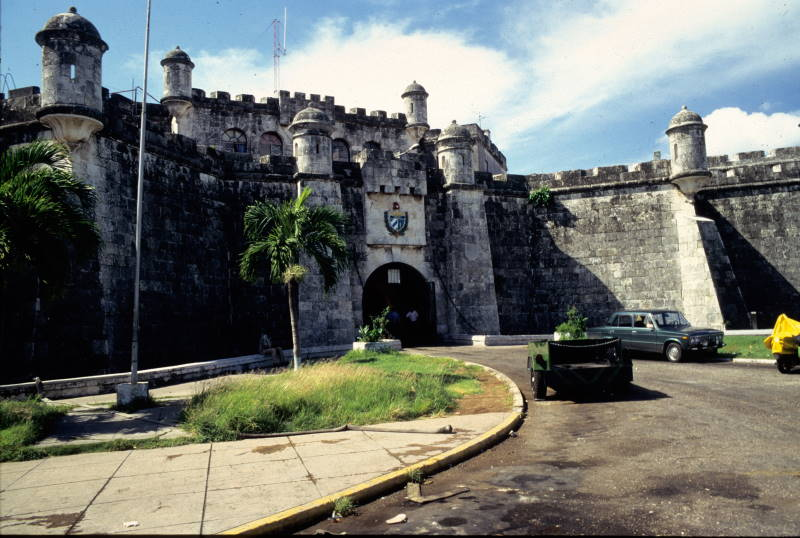
18th-century entrance of the Castillo del Príncipe, photo taken in 1997

1. Playa: Santa Fe, Siboney, Cubanacán, Ampliación Almendares, Miramar, Sierra, Ceiba, Buena Vista.
2. Plaza de la Revolución: El Carmelo, Vedado-Malecón, Rampa, Príncipe, Plaza, Nuevo Vedado-Puentes Grandes, Colón-Nuevo Vedado, Vedado.
3. Centro Habana: Cayo Hueso, Pueblo Nuevo, Los Sitios, Dragones, Colón.
4. La Habana Vieja: Prado, Catedral, Plaza Vieja, Belén, San Isidro, Jesús María, Tallapiedra.
5. Regla: Guaicanimar, Loma Modelo, Casablanca.
6. La Habana del Este: Camilo Cienfuegos, Cojímar, Guiteras, Alturas de Alamar, Alamar Este, Guanabo, Campo Florido, Alamar-Playa.
7. Guanabacoa: Mañana-Habana Nueva, Villa I, Villa II, Chivas-Roble, Debeche-Nalon, Hata-Naranjo, Peñalver-Bacuranao, Minas-Barreras.
8. San Miguel del Padrón: Rocafort, Luyanó Moderno, Diezmero, San Francisco de Paula, Dolores-Veracruz, Jacomino.
9. Diez de Octubre: Luyanó, Jesús del Monte, Lawton, Vista Alegre, Goyle, Sevillano, La Víbora, Santos Suárez, Tamarindo.
10. Cerro: Latinoamericano, Pilar-Atares, Cerro, Las Cañas, El Canal, Palatino, Armada.
11. Marianao: CAI-Los Ángeles, Pocito-Palmas, Zamora-Cocosolo, Libertad, Pogoloti-Belén-Finlay, Santa Felicia.
12. La Lisa: Alturas de La Lisa, Balcón Arimao, El Cano-Valle Grande-Bello 26 y Morado, Punta Brava, Arroyo Arenas, San Agustín, Versalles-Coronela.
13. Boyeros: Santiago de Las Vegas, Nuevo Santiago, Boyeros, Wajay, Calabazar, Altahabana-Capdevila, Armada-Aldabó.
14. Arroyo Naranjo: Los Pinos, Poey, Víbora Park, Mantilla, Párraga, Calvario-Fraternidad, Guinera, Eléctrico, Managua, Callejas.
15. Cotorro: San Pedro-Centro Cotorro, Santa Maria del Rosario, Lotería, Cuatro Caminos, Magdalena-Torriente, Alberro.

== Demography ==
Historical population
Year	Pop.	±%
1750	70,000	—
1907	297,159	+324.5%
1931	728,500	+145.2%
1943	868,426	+19.2%
1953	1,139,579	+31.2%
1970	1,786,522	+56.8%
1981	1,929,432	+8.0%
2002	2,171,671	+12.6%
2012	2,106,146	−3.0%
2018	2,131,480	+1.2%
2024	1,749,964	−17.9%

By the end of the 2012 census, 19.1% of the population of Cuba lived in Havana., or 2,106,146 people. The city has an average life expectancy of 76.81 years at birth. By the end of 2024, after the Cuban migration crisis of 2021-2023 in which Havana along with the provinces of Camagüey and Cienfuegos were hit hardest, the population dropped to 1,749,964, according to the Office of Statistics and Information of La Habana.

Havana agglomeration grew rapidly during the first half of the 20th century reaching 1 million inhabitants in the 1943 census. The con-urbanization expanded over the Havana municipality borders into neighbor municipalities of Marianao, Regla and Guanabacoa. Starting from the 1980s, the city's population is growing slowly as a result of balanced development policies, low birth rate, its relatively high rate of emigration abroad, and controlled domestic migration. Because of the city and country's low birth rate and high life expectancy, its age structure is similar to a developed country, with Havana having an even higher proportion of elderly than the country as a whole.

=== Ethnic breakdown ===
According to the 2012 national census of Havana's population (the Cuban census and similar studies use the term "skin color" instead of "race").

- White: 58.4%, (Spanish descent were most common)
- Mestizo or Mulatto (mixed race): 26.4%
- Black: 15.2%
- Asian: 0.2%

As with the other Caribbean nations, there are few mestizos in Havana (and Cuba as a whole), in contrast to other Latin American countries, because the indigenous Taíno population was virtually wiped out by Eurasian diseases in the earliest period of the Spanish conquest.

The Cuban government controls the movement of people into Havana on the grounds that the Havana metropolitan area (home to nearly 20% of the country's population) is overstretched in terms of land use, water, electricity, transportation, and other elements of the urban infrastructure. There is a population of internal migrants to Havana nicknamed "palestinos" (Palestinians) who mostly hail from the eastern region of Oriente.

The city's significant minority of Chinese, mostly of Cantonese origin, were brought in the mid-19th century by Spanish settlers via the Philippines with work contracts and, after completing eight-year contracts, many Chinese immigrants settled permanently in Havana. Before the revolution, the Chinese population counted to over 200,000, today, Chinese ancestors could count up to 100,000. Chinese born/ native Chinese (mostly Cantonese as well) are around 400 presently. There are some 3,000 Russians living in the city; as reported by the Russian Embassy in Havana; most are women married to Cubans who had studied in the Soviet Union. Havana also shelters other non-Cuban populations of an unknown size. There is a population of several thousand North African teen and pre-teen refugees. From the mid-20th century census of 1953 to 2018 (the most recent census), Havana's population has grown by an estimated 87 percent, a growth rate typical of most Caribbean cities.

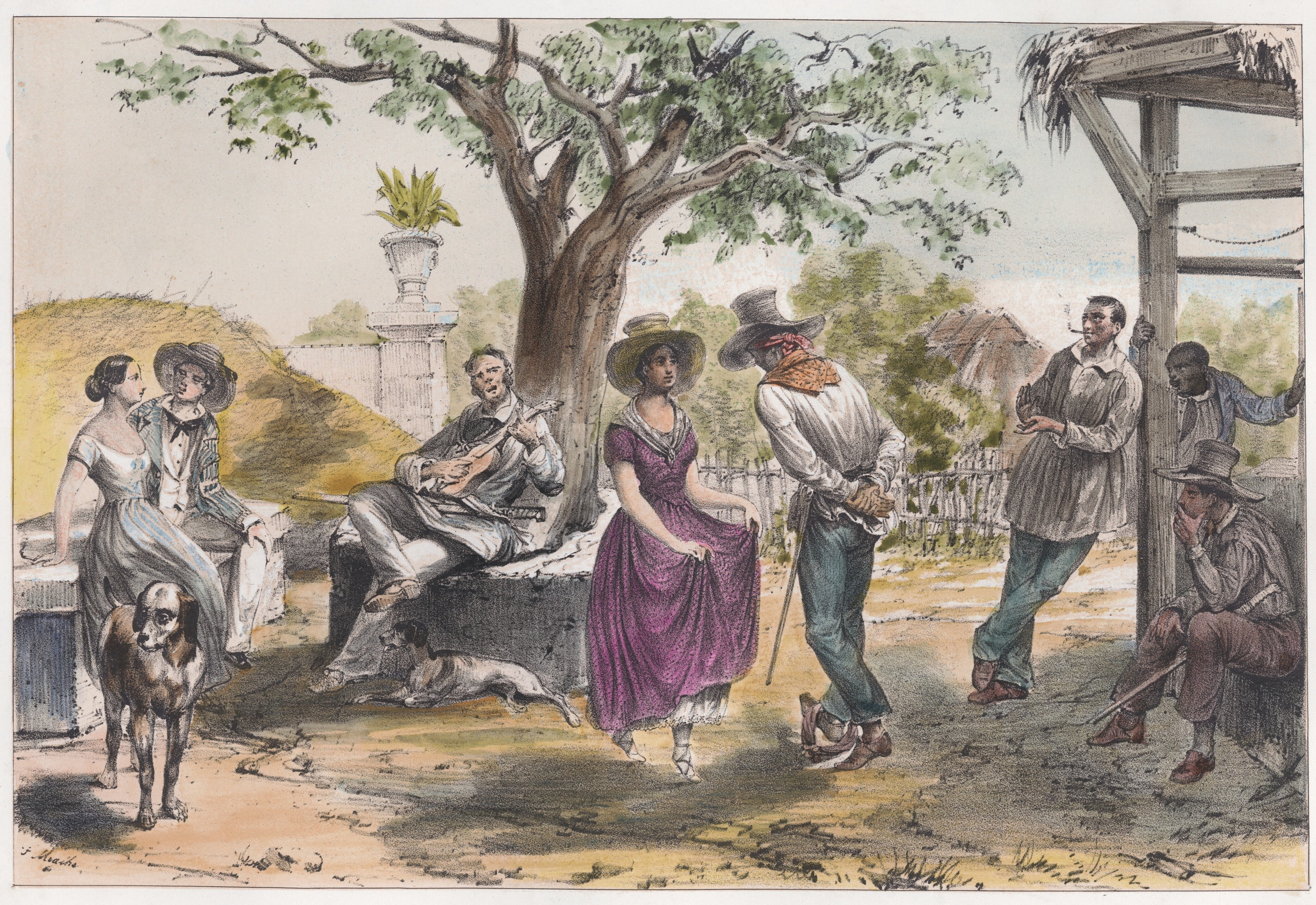
El Zapateado, Havana, in 1847, by Frédéric Mialhe

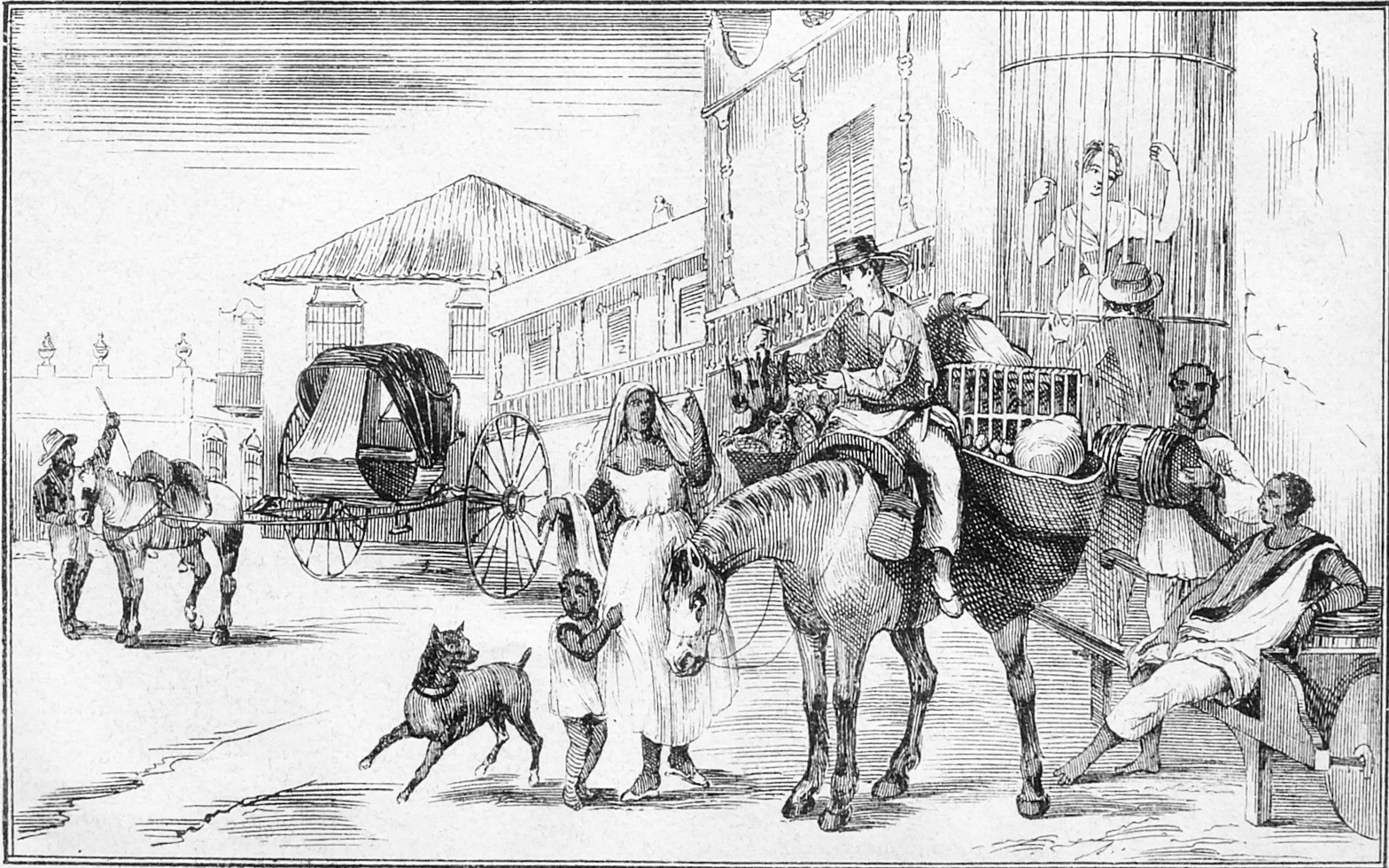
El Casero, Havana, in 1855, by B. May and Frédéric Mialhe

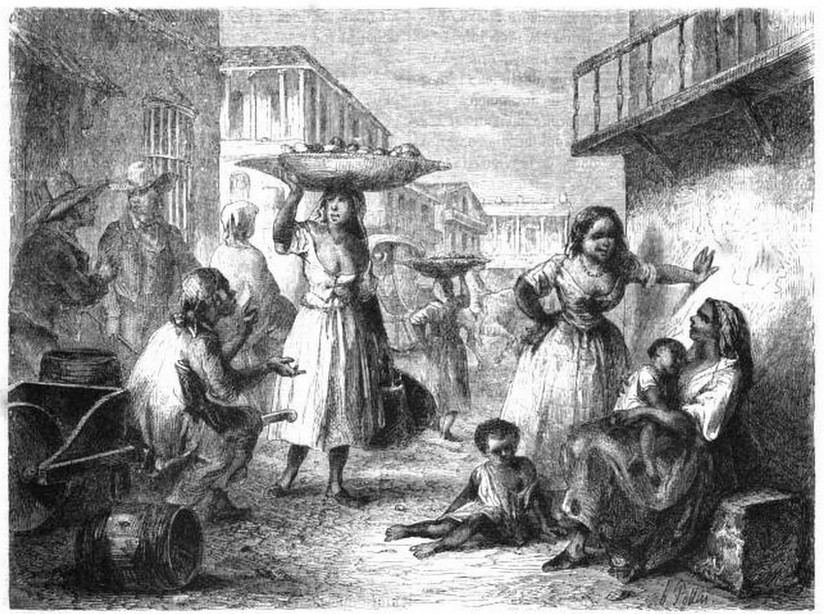
Havana residents in 1860 painted by Joseph Navlet

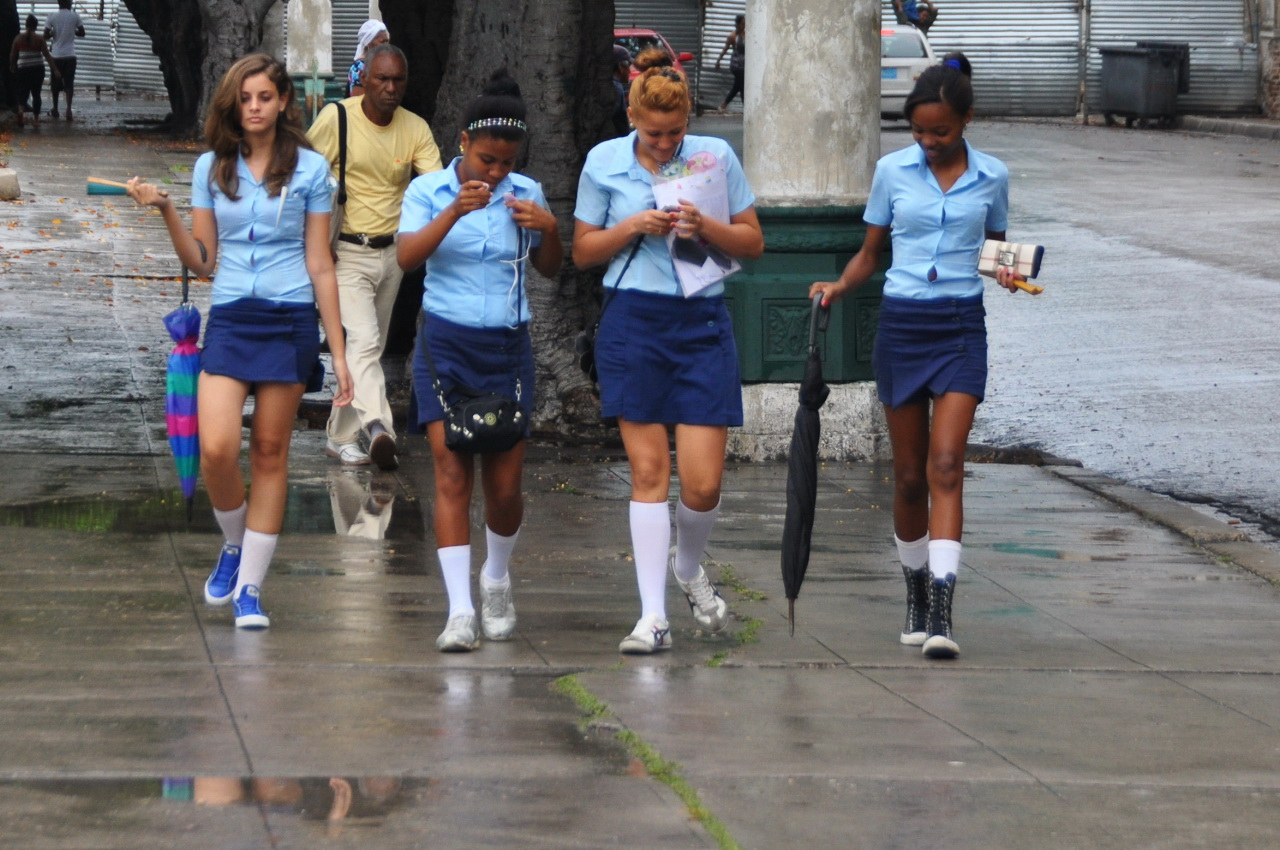
School students in Havana, 2012

=== Religion ===
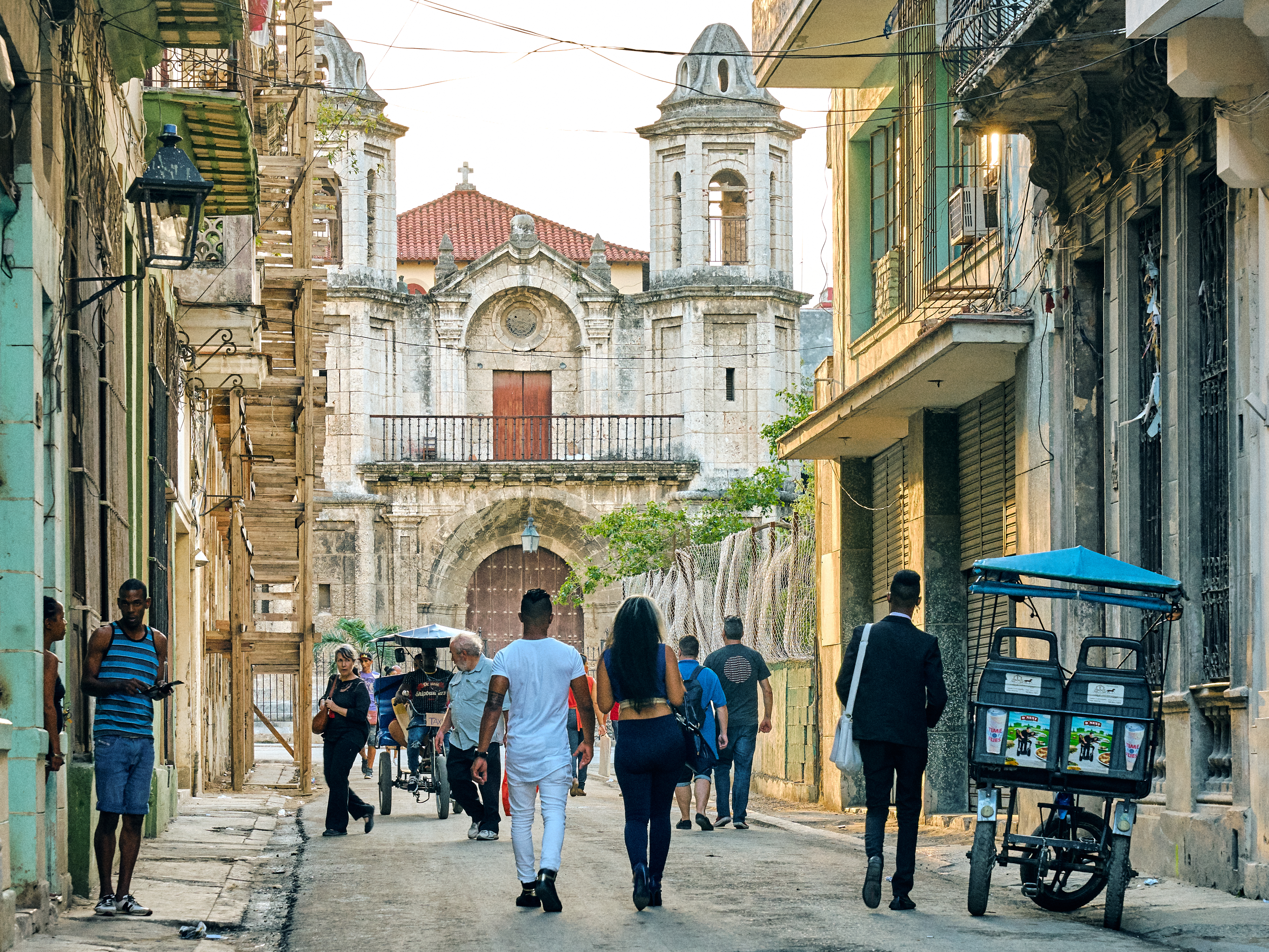
Colonial Church Santo Cristo del Buen Viaje, built between 1604 and 1693

Roman Catholics form the largest religious group in Havana. Havana is one of the three Metropolitan sees on the island (the others being Camagüey and Santiago), with two suffragan bishoprics: Matanzas and Pinar del Río. Its patron saint is San Cristóbal (Saint Christopher), to whom the cathedral is devoted. it also has a minor basilica, Basílica Santuario Nacional de Nuestra Señora de la Caridad del Cobre and two other national shrines, Jesús Nazareno del Rescate and San Lázaro (El Rincón). It received papal visits from three successive supreme pontiffs: Pope John Paul II (January 1998), Pope Benedict XVI (March 2012) and Pope Francis (September 2015).

The Jewish community in Havana has reduced after the Revolution from once having embraced more than 15,000 Jews, many of whom had fled Nazi persecution and subsequently left Cuba to Miami or to Israel after Castro took to power in 1959. The city once had five synagogues, but only three remain (one Orthodox, and two Conservative: one Conservative Ashkenazi and one Conservative Sephardic), Beth Shalom Grand Synagogue is one of them and another that is a hybrid of all 3 put together. In February 2007, The New York Times estimated that there were about 1,500 known Jews living in Havana.

== Economy ==
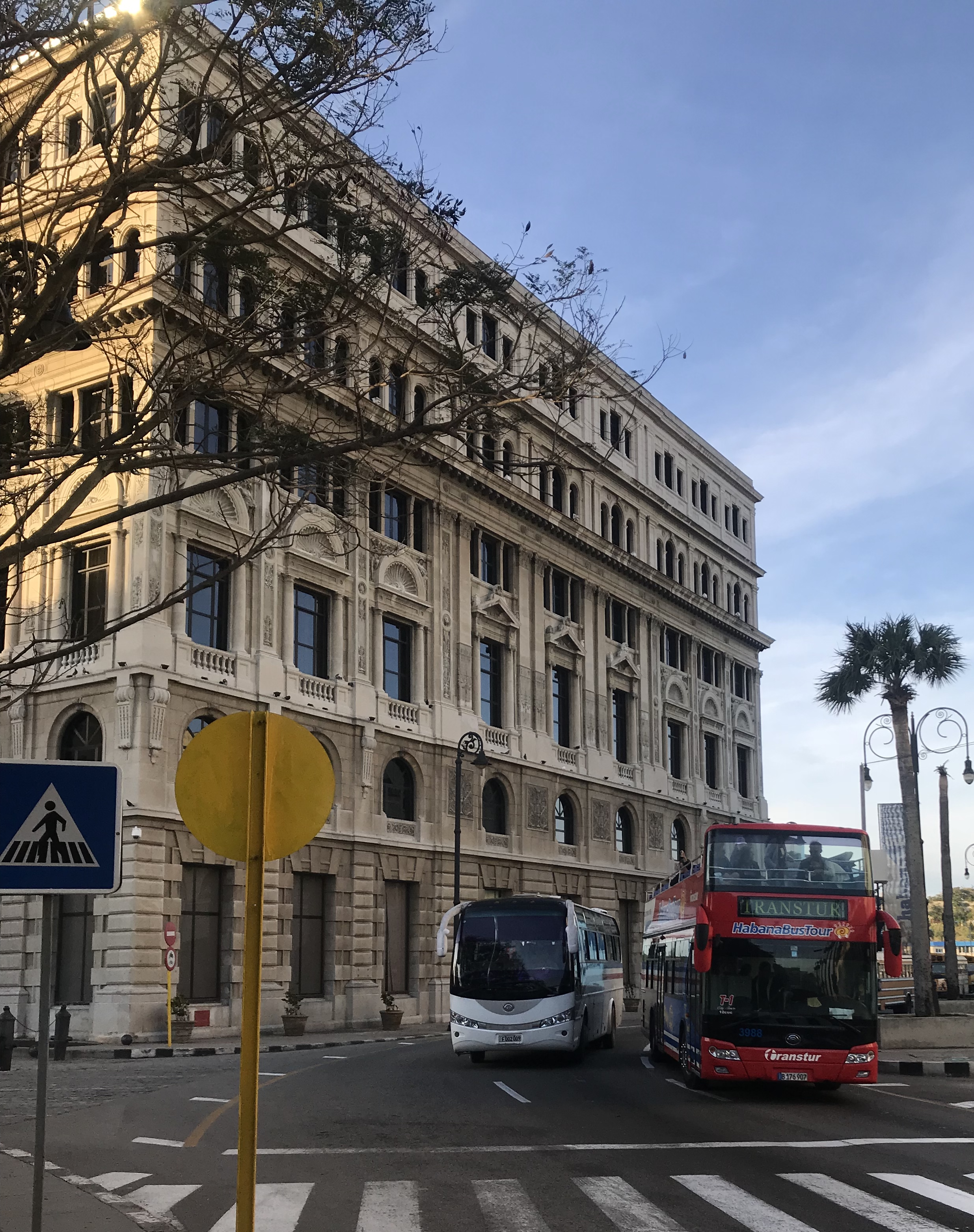
Lonja del Comercio building

The city's economy first developed on the basis of its location, which made it one of the early great trade centers in the New World. Sugar and a flourishing slave trade first brought riches to the city, and later, after independence, it became a renowned resort. Despite efforts by Fidel Castro's government to spread Cuba's industrial activity to all parts of the island, Havana remains the center of much of the nation's industry. Today Havana has a diversified economy, with traditional sectors, such as manufacturing, construction, transportation and communications, and new or revived ones such as biotechnology and tourism.

The traditional sugar industry, upon which the island's economy has been based for three centuries, is centered elsewhere on the island and controls some three-fourths of the export economy. But light manufacturing facilities, meat-packing plants, and chemical and pharmaceutical operations are concentrated in Havana. Other food-processing industries are also important, along with shipbuilding, vehicle manufacturing, production of alcoholic beverages (particularly rum), textiles, and tobacco products, particularly the world-famous Habanos cigars. Although the harbors of Cienfuegos and Matanzas, in particular, have been developed under the revolutionary government, Havana remains Cuba's primary port facility; 50% of Cuban imports and exports pass through Havana. The port also supports a considerable fishing industry.

In 2000, nearly 89% of the city's officially recorded labor force worked for government-run agencies, institutions or enterprises. Havana, on average, has the country's highest incomes and human development indicators. After the collapse of the Soviet Union, Cuba re-emphasized tourism as a major industry leading to its recovery. Tourism is now Havana and Cuba's primary economic source.

Havana's economy is still in flux, despite Raúl Castro's embrace of free enterprise in 2011. Though there was an uptick in small businesses in 2011, many have since gone out of business, due to lack of business and income on the part of the local residents, whose salaries average $20 per month.

=== Commerce and finance ===
After the Revolution, Cuba's traditional capitalist free-enterprise system was replaced by a heavily socialized economic system. In Havana, Cuban-owned businesses and U.S.-owned businesses were nationalized and today most businesses operate solely under state control.

In Old Havana and throughout Vedado there are several small private businesses, such as shoe-repair shops or dressmaking facilities. Banking as well is also under state control, and the National Bank of Cuba, headquartered in Havana, is the control center of the Cuban economy. Its branches in some cases occupy buildings that were in pre-revolutionary times the offices of Cuban or foreign banks. Plaza Carlos III is a large shopping center in Centro Habana.

In the late 1990s Vedado, located along the Atlantic waterfront, started to represent the principal commercial area. It was developed extensively between 1930 and 1960, when Havana developed as a major destination for U.S. tourists; high-rise hotels, casinos, restaurants, and upscale commercial establishments, many reflecting the art deco style.

Vedado is today Havana's financial district, and the main banks, airline companies offices, shops, most businesses headquarters, numerous high-rise apartments and hotels, are located in the area. The University of Havana is located in Vedado.

=== Tourism ===
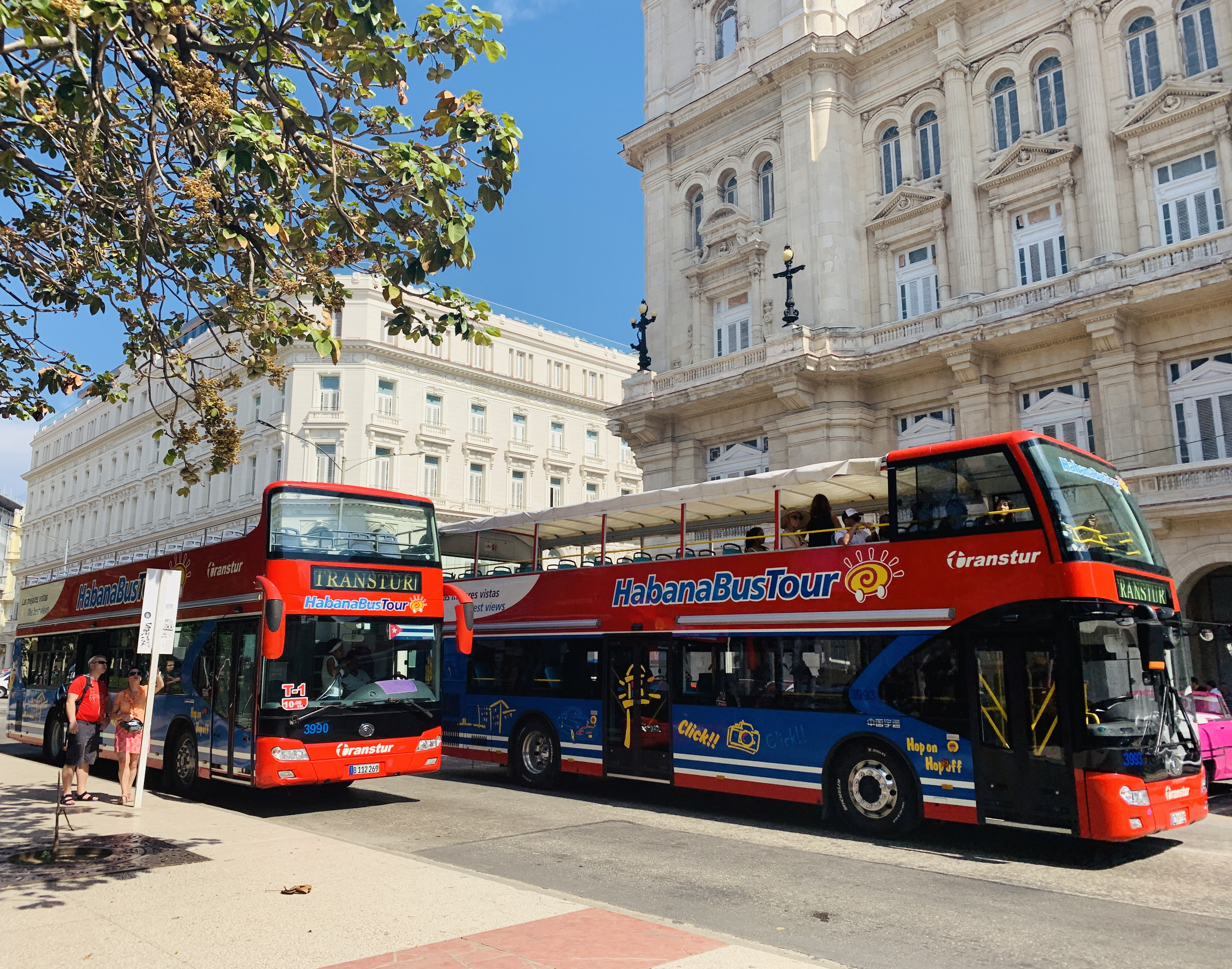
Sight-seeing busses at the Parque Central

The city has long been a popular attraction for tourists. Between 1915 and 1930, Havana hosted more tourists than any other location in the Caribbean. The influx was due in large part to Cuba's proximity to the United States, where restrictive prohibition on alcohol and other pastimes stood in stark contrast to the island's traditionally relaxed attitude to leisure pursuits. A pamphlet published by E.C. Kropp Co., Milwaukee, WI, between 1921 and 1939 promoting tourism in Havana, Cuba, can be found in the University of Houston Digital Library, Havana, Cuba, The Summer Land of the World, Digital Collection.

With the deterioration of Cuba – United States relations and the imposition of the trade embargo on the island in 1961, tourism dropped drastically and did not return to anything close to its pre-revolution levels until 1989. The revolutionary government in general, and Fidel Castro in particular, opposed any considerable development of tourism. In 1982, the Cuban government passed a foreign investment code that opened a number of sectors to foreign capital.

Through the creation of firms open to such foreign investment (such as Cubanacan), Cuba began to attract capital for hotel development, managing to increase the number of tourists from 130,000 (in 1980) to 326,000 (by the end of that decade).

Havana has also been a popular health tourism destination for more than 20 years. Foreign patients travel to Cuba, Havana in particular, for a wide range of treatments including eye-surgery, neurological disorders such as multiple sclerosis and Parkinson's disease, and orthopedics. Many patients are from Latin America, although medical treatment for retinitis pigmentosa, often known as night blindness, has attracted many patients from Europe and North America. Havana attracts over a million tourists annually, the Official Census for Havana reports that in 2010 the city was visited by 1,176,627 international tourists, a 20% increase from 2005.

=== Poverty and slums ===
Housing Units and Population of Havana Slums
Housing type	Year	Units	Population	% of Total Pop.
cuartería^{(a)}	2001	60,754	206,564	9.4
slums	2001	21,552	72,986	3.3
shelters	1997	2,758	9,178	0.4
^{(a)}A cuartería (or ciudadela, solar) is a large inner-city old mansion or hotel or boarding house subdivided into rooms, sometimes with over 60 families.

The years after the Soviet Union collapsed in 1991, the city, and Cuba in general have suffered decades of economic deterioration, including the Special Period of the 1990s. The national government does not have an official definition of poverty. The government researchers argue that "poverty" in most commonly accepted meanings does not really exist in Cuba, but rather that there is a sector of the population that can be described as "at risk" or "vulnerable" using internationally accepted measures.

The generic term "slum" is seldom used in Cuba, substandard housing is described: housing type, housing conditions, building materials, and settlement type. The National Housing Institute considers units in solares (a large inner-city mansion or older hotel or boarding house subdivided into rooms, sometimes with over 60 families) and shanty towns to be the "precarious housing stock" and tracks their number.

Most slum units are concentrated in the inner-city municipalities of Old Havana and Centro Habana, and such neighborhoods as Atarés in Regla. People living in slums have access to the same education, health care, job opportunities and social security as those who live in formerly privileged neighborhoods. Shanty towns are scattered throughout the city except for in a few central areas.

Over 9% of Havana's population live in cuartería (solares, ciudadela), 3.3% in shanty towns, and 0.3% in refugee shelters. This does not include an estimate of the number of people living in housing in "fair" or "poor" condition because in many cases these units do not necessarily constitute slum housing but rather are basically sound dwellings needing repairs. According to Instituto Nacional de Vivienda (National Housing Institute) official figures, in 2001, 64% of Havana's 586,768 units were considered in "good" condition, up from 50% in 1990. Some 20% were in "fair" condition and 16% in "poor" condition.

Partial or total building collapses are not uncommon, although the number had been cut in half by the end of the 1990s as the worst units disappeared and others were repaired. Buildings in Old Havana and Centro Habana are especially exposed to the elements: high humidity, the corrosive effects of salt spray from proximity to the coast, and occasional flooding. Most areas of the city, especially the highly populated districts, are in urban decay.

== Transport ==
=== Airports ===
Havana is served by José Martí International Airport. The Airport lies about 11 kilometers (7 mi) south of the city center, in the municipality of Boyeros, and is the main hub for Cuba's flag carrier Cubana de Aviación. The airport is Cuba's main international and domestic gateway. It connects Havana with the rest of the Caribbean, North, Central and South America, Europe and one destination in Africa.

Havana is also served by Playa Baracoa Airport, a small airport to the west of city used for some domestic flights, primarily Aerogaviota.

=== Rail ===
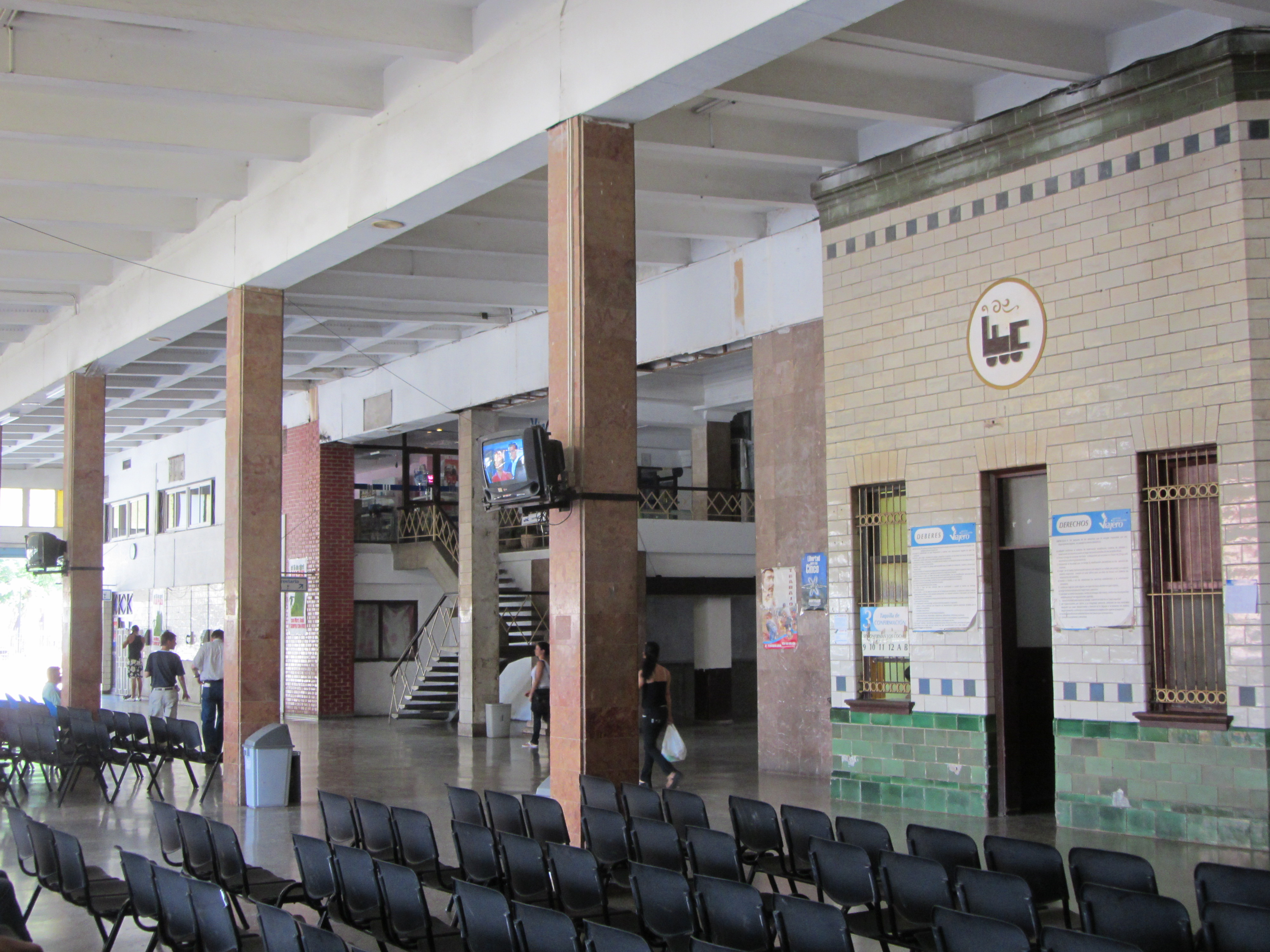
The interior of Havana Central Railway Station

Havana has a network of suburban, interurban and long-distance rail lines. The railways are nationalized and run by the FFCC (Ferrocarriles de Cuba – Railways of Cuba). The FFCC connects Havana with all the provinces of Cuba, and the Havana Suburban Railway serves the city. The main railway stations are: Central Rail Station, La Coubre Rail Station, Casablanca Station, and Estación de Tulipán.

In 2004 the annual passenger volume was some 11 million, but demand is estimated at two-and-a-half to three times this value, with the busiest route being between Havana and Santiago de Cuba, some 836 kilometers (519 mi) apart by rail. In 2000 the Union de Ferrocarriles de Cuba bought French first class airconditioned coaches. New Chinese made and Russian made coaches for distance trains debuted in the 2010s, and some now serve suburban services.

In the 1980s there were plans for a Metro system in Havana similar to Moscow's, as a result of the Soviet Union influence in Cuba at the time. The studies of geology and finance made by Cuban, Czech and Soviet specialists were already well advanced in the 1980s. The Cuban press showed the construction project and the course route, linking municipalities and neighborhoods in the capital. In the late 1980s the project had already begun, each mile (1.6 km) of track was worth a million dollars at the time, but with the fall of the Soviet Union in 1991 the project was later dropped.

=== Interurban ===
An interurban line, (Note: This term describe the equivalent to a tram.) known as the Hershey Electric Railway, built in 1917 runs from Casablanca (across the harbor from Old Havana) to Hershey and on to Matanzas.

=== Tramway ===
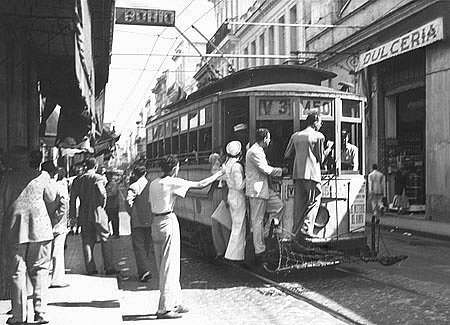
The Havana tramway in 1950

Havana operated a tram system until 1952, which began as a horsecar system, Ferro Carril Urbano de la Habana in 1858, merged with rival coach operator in 1863 as Empresa del Ferro-Carril Urbano y Omnibus de La Habana and later electrified in 1900 under new foreign owners as Havana Electric Railway Company. Ridership decline resulted in bankruptcy in 1950 with new owner Autobus Modernos SA abandoning the systems in favor of buses and the remaining cars were sold to Matanzas in 1952.

=== Roads ===
The city's road network is quite extensive, and has broad avenues, main streets and major access roads to the city such as the Autopista Nacional (A1), Carretera Central and Via Blanca. The road network has been under construction and growth since the Spanish era but is undergoing a major deterioration due to low maintenance. Motorways (autopistas) include:

- A1 – Autopista Nacional, from Havana to Santa Clara and Sancti Spiritus, with additional short sections near Santiago and Guantanamo
- A4 – Autopista Este-Oeste, from Havana to Pinar del Río
- Via Blanca, to Matanzas and Varadero
- Havana ring road (Spanish: Primer anillo), which starts at a tunnel under the entrance to Havana Harbor
- Autopista del Mediodia, from Havana to San Antonio de los Baños
- an autopista from Havana to Melena del Sur
- an autopista from Havana to Mariel

== Education ==
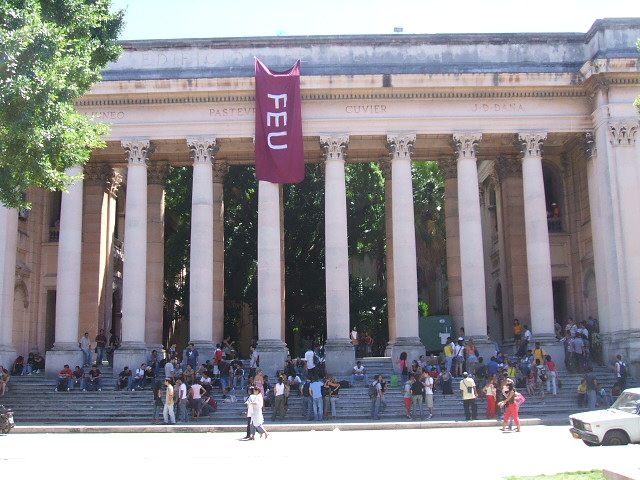
The department of Mathematics and Computer Science, University of Havana

The national government assumes all responsibility for education, and there are adequate primary, secondary, and vocational training schools throughout Cuba. The schools are of varying quality and education is free and compulsory at all levels except higher learning, which is also free.

The University of Havana, located in the Vedado section of Havana, was established in 1728 and was regarded as a leading institution of higher learning in the Western Hemisphere. Soon after the Revolution, the university, as well as all other educational institutions, were nationalized. Since then several other universities have opened, like the Higher Learning Polytechnic Institute José Antonio Echeverría where the vast majority of today's Cuban engineers are taught.

The Cuban National Ballet School with 4,350 students is one of the largest ballet schools in the world and the most prestigious ballet school in Cuba.

== Landmarks and historical centers ==
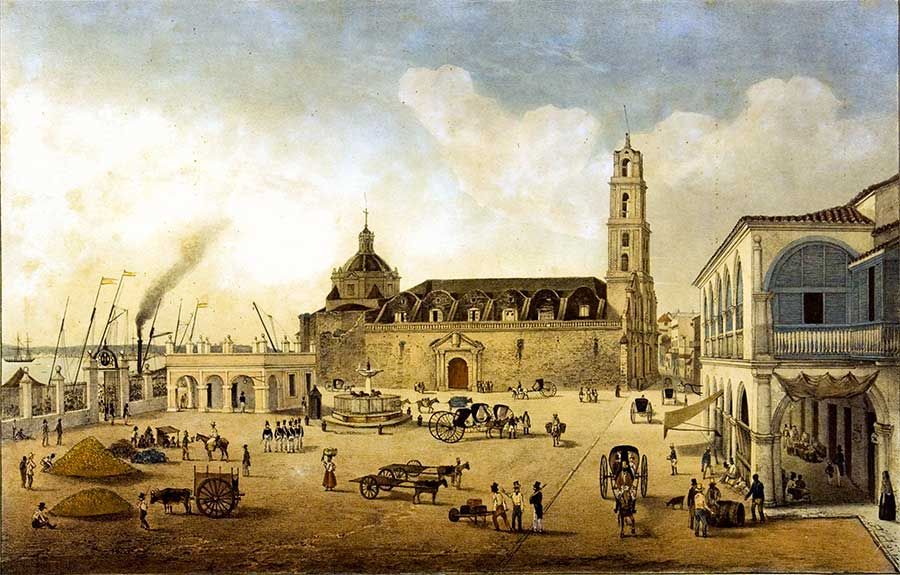
The Plaza de San Francisco of Havana in 1841 by James G. Sawkins

- Habana Vieja: contains the core of the original city of Havana. It was declared a UNESCO World Heritage Site.
- Plaza Vieja: a plaza in Old Havana, it was the site of executions, processions, bullfights, and fiestas.
- Fortress San Carlos de la Cabaña: a fortress located on the east side of the Havana bay, La Cabaña is the most impressive fortress from Spanish times, particularly its walls constructed at the end of the 18th century.
- El Capitolio Nacional: built in 1929 as the Senate and House of Representatives, the colossal building is recognizable by its dome, which dominates the city's skyline. Inside stands the third largest indoor statue in the world, La Estatua de la República. Nowadays, the Cuban Academy of Sciences headquarters and the Museo Nacional de Historia Natural (the National Museum of Natural History) has its venue within the building and contains the largest natural history collection in the country.
- El Morro Castle: is a fortress guarding the entrance to Havana bay; Morro Castle was built because of the threat to the harbor from pirates.
- Fortress San Salvador de la Punta: a small fortress built in the 16th century, at the western entry point to the Havana harbor, it played a crucial role in the defense of Havana during the initial centuries of Spanish presence. It houses some twenty old guns and military antiques.
- Christ of Havana: Havana's 20-meter (66 ft) marble statue of Christ (1958) blesses the city from the east hillside of the bay, much like the famous Cristo Redentor in Rio de Janeiro.
- The Great Theatre of Havana: is an opera house famous particularly for the National Ballet of Cuba, it sometimes hosts performances by the National Opera. The theater is also known as concert hall, García Lorca, the biggest in Cuba.
- The Malecon/Sea wall: is the avenue that runs along the north coast of the city, beside the seawall. The Malecón is the most popular avenue of Havana, it is known for its sunsets.
- Hotel Nacional de Cuba: an Art Deco National Hotel famous in the 1950s as a gambling and entertainment complex.
- Museo de la Revolución: located in the former Presidential Palace, with the yacht Granma on display behind the museum.
- Necrópolis Cristóbal Colón: a cemetery and open-air museum, it is one of the most famous cemeteries in Latin America, known for its beauty and magnificence. The cemetery was built in 1876 and has nearly 1 million tombs. Some gravestones are decorated with sculpture by Ramos Blancos, among others.

== Culture ==
=== Symbols ===
The coat of arms of La Habana

The coat of arms of Havana consists of three castles that represent the three castles that defended the city: the Fuerza Castle, the Morro Castle and the Punta Castle. The key represents that Havana was the gateway to the New World. The shield, supported by an oak branch on one side and a laurel wreath on the other, symbolizes the strength of the nation, the laurel wreath, honor, and glory. These symbols represent the rights of man.

=== Architecture ===
Plaza del Vapor, Havana, about 1900

Havana has diverse styles of architecture, from castles built in the 16th century, to modernist high-rise buildings. The present condition of many structures have deteriorated since 1959 or have been demolished, including the demolition of the Plaza del Vapor, built in 1835 by the architect of the Palacio de la Marquesa de Villalba, Eugenio Rayneri Sorrentino, the father of Eugenio Rayneri Piedra the architect of the El Capitolio of 1929. The Plaza del Vapor was demolished in 1959 by the new, revolutionary government. (Note: The Plaza del Vapor met a similar fate in 1959 as the Paris food market Les Halles would meet in 1971. Les Halles, unable to compete in the new market economy and in need of massive repairs, the colorful ambiance once associated with the bustling area of merchant stalls, diappeared altogether when Les Halles was dismantled; the wholesale market was relocated to the suburb of Rungis. Two of the glass and cast iron market pavilions were dismantled and re-erected elsewhere; one in the Paris suburb of Nogent-sur-Marne, the other in Yokohama, Japan. At the beginning of the 1959 Revolution Fidel Castro ordered to stop all construction in Cuba, and to have the Plaza del Vapor demolished; the Ministry of Public Health declared the Plaza del Vapor unhealthy and its vendors were resettled on the grounds of Calle Amistad between Calles Estrella and Monte where the demolished Mars and Belona dance academy had operated for years. The National Institute of Savings and Housing (INAV) replaced Batista's National Lottery, which had been abolished by the Revolutionary government, and a new lottery to raise money for new construction, and directed by Pastorita Núñez who projected that a new, modern building, not unlike those that were proposed by Josep Lluís Sert a year earlier in his Havana Plan Piloto of 1955–1958 would now be built in the empty lot.) (Note: (INAV) is a state agency created with the objective of building houses for all Cubans who lacked them a lottery,) Numerous building collapses throughout the city have resulted in injuries and deaths due to a lack of maintenance.

==== Spanish ====
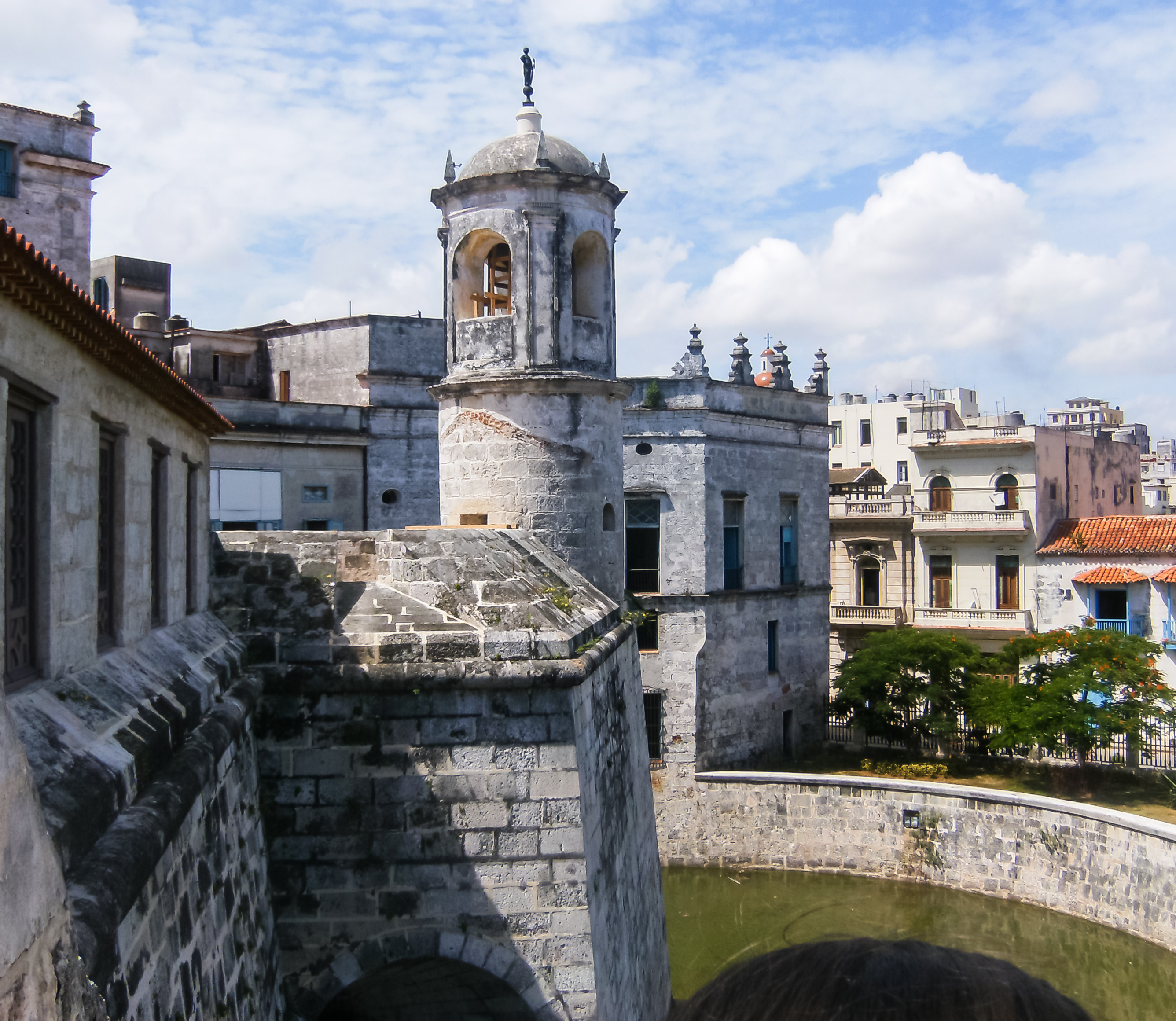
Castle of la Real Fuerza, 1577

Riches were brought from the Spanish into and through Havana as it was a key transshipment point between the New World and Old World. As a result, Havana was the most heavily fortified city in the Americas. Most examples of early architecture can be seen in military fortifications such as La Fortaleza de San Carlos de la Cabana (1558–1577) designed by Battista Antonelli and the Castillo del Morro (1589–1630). This sits at the entrance of Havana Bay and provides an insight into the supremacy and wealth at that time.

Old Havana was also protected by a defensive wall begun in 1674 but had already overgrown its boundaries when it was completed in 1767, becoming the new neighborhood of Centro Habana. The influence from different styles and cultures can be seen in Havana's Spanish architecture, with a diverse range of Mudéjar architecture, Spanish, Italian, Greek and Roman. The San Carlos and San Ambrosio Seminary (18th century) is a good example of early Spanish influenced architecture. The Havana cathedral (1748–1777) dominating the Plaza de la Catedral (1749) is the best example of Cuban Baroque. Surrounding it are the former palaces of the Count de Casa-Bayona (1720–1746) Marquis de Arcos (1746) and the Marquis de Aguas Claras (1751–1775).

The Iglesia del Espíritu Santo was devoted in 1638. The Espíritu Santo contains some notable paintings including a seated, post-crucifixion Christ on the right wall, and catacombs. It is considered one of the oldest temples in Havana and it is said that its main interest lies essentially in the simplicity of the beautiful stone construction. The church was rebuilt and expanded in 1648 and given the rank of a parish. During the Spanish era it had exceptional importance, since by a Papal Bull of 1772 and a Royal Certificate of 1773, of Charles III of Spain, it was declared "Única Iglesia inmune en esta ciudad, construida en 1855." ("the only immune church in this city, built-in 1855."), which meant that any persecuted individual could find Amparo (sanctuary) in it against the action of the authorities or of justice. A metal plaque at the foot of the bell tower attests to this fact. The Iglesia del Espíritu Santo's greatest interest from an architectural point of view lies in the simplicity of the coral stone construction and the lack of lavish decoration. (Note: Many buildings in Havana are constructed out of coral stone including the Colegio Nacional de Arquitectos de Cuba, the promenade of El Prado, and the San Carlos and San Ambrosio Seminary. Some of the exterior walls along Calle N on the ground floor of the podium of the FOCSA Building are covered with 12"x12" coral tiles.) Other elements of great importance are the funerary crypts that were discovered in 1953. The crypt is from times before the Colón Cemetery (1876) in El Vedado was built.

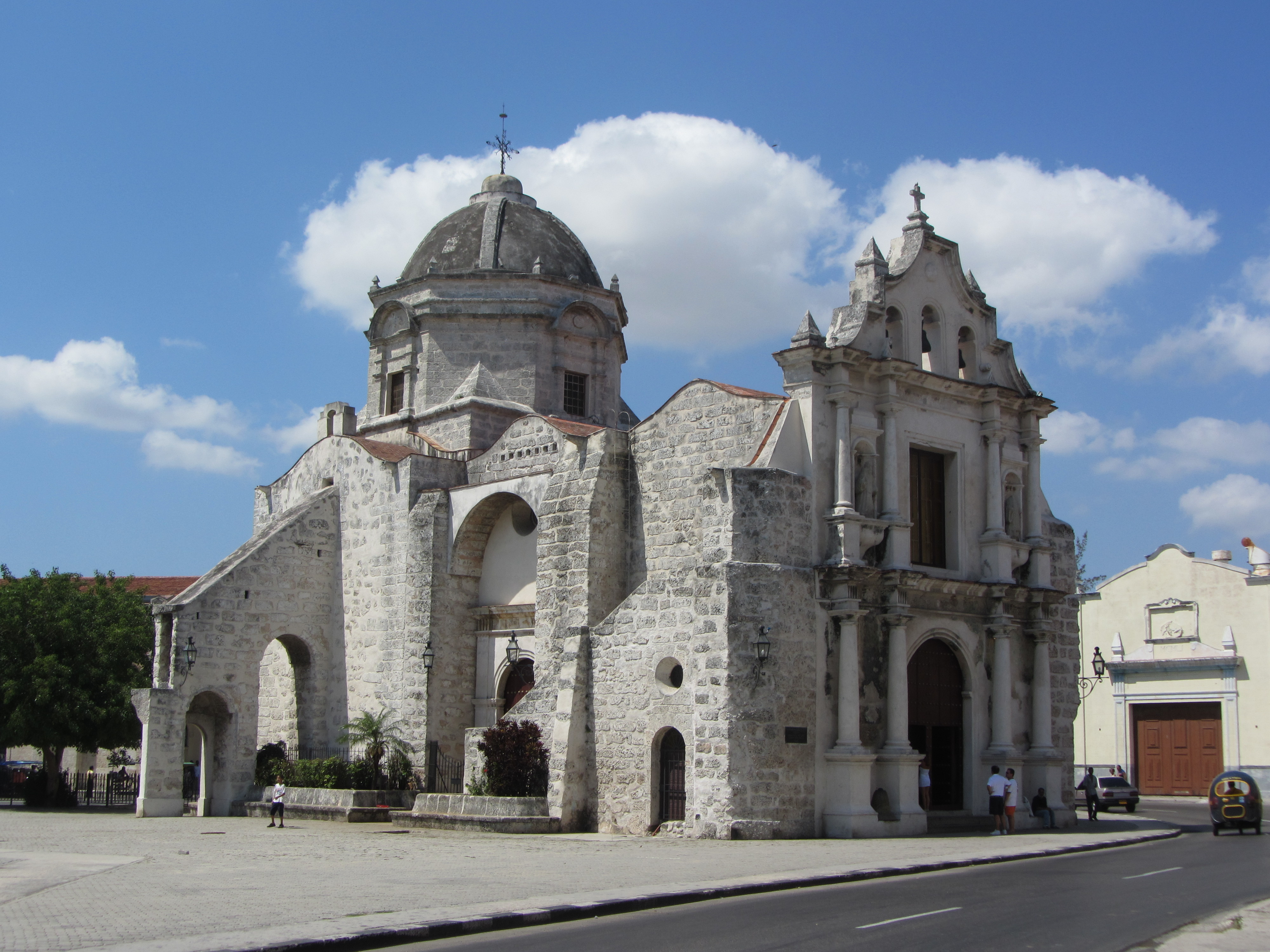
Iglesia y hospital San Francisco de Paula

The Alameda de Paula was the first promenade in Cuba, designed and constructed in 1776 by Antonio Fernández Trevejo, following the instructions of the Laureano de Torres y Ayala, it was created on the site of the old Rincón refuse dump. It was an embankment with two rows of poplar trees and some benches, it became one of Havana's most important social and cultural spaces, it was the model of the Paseo del Prado designed in 1925. It was given the name Alameda de Paula because of its proximity to the old Hospital and Iglesia of San Francisco de Paula. Between 1803 and 1805 the pavement was tiled, a fountain and stone benches, lampposts and the marble column were added, it qualified as a pleasant entertainment for the residents of the Villa de San Cristóbal, lacking recreational sites at that time. In 1841, the stairs that gave access to the promenade were widened and several lampposts were added. In the year 2000, the Havana promenade was restored and extended until it reached the Iglesia de San Francisco de Paula.

Towards the end of the 17th century, the first stone of what would be the hospital for women and the church of San Francisco de Paula was placed, the buildings were expanded in 1731 with the support and donations from the City Council and orders of the different General Captains in command of the island. In 1776, it was the most important hospital in Havana, there were several generations of famous doctors that trained here. The Presbyter of the Cathedral of Havana, don Nicolás Estévez Borges, in 1664 ordered the construction of a Hospital for Women and an adjoining church devoted to Saint Francis of Paola who was one of the founders of the Roman Catholic Order of the Minims. (Note: The San Francisco de Paula Hospital for women began its functions in 1672, welcoming, in crowded conditions most of the time, black and white mentally ill patients. The gloomy aspect of the construction and the screams of the sick women made this place a well-known place in the area, but not for the reasons why hospitals like to be known, but as a gloomy reference. In the great 19th century Creole novel, Cecilia Valdés by Cirilo Villaverde, the church-hospital is evoked several times because, supposedly, Cecilia's mother was confined there when she lost the use of her mental faculties after the troubles and vicissitudes of her love affair with Don Cándido Gamboa.) Both buildings were completely destroyed by a hurricane in 1730 and were rebuilt and enlarged in 1745 in the Baroque style seen today.

==== Neoclassical ====
Neoclassism was introduced into the city in the 1840s, at the time including Gas public lighting in 1848 and the railroad in 1837. In the second half of the 18th century, sugar and coffee production increased rapidly, which became essential in the development of Havana's most prominent architectural style. Many wealthy Habaneros took their inspiration from the French; this can be seen within the interiors of upper-class houses such as the Aldama Palace built in 1844. This is considered the most important neoclassical residential building in Cuba and typifies the design of many houses of this period with portales of neoclassical columns facing open spaces or courtyards.

In 1925 Jean-Claude Nicolas Forestier, the head of urban planning in Paris moved to Havana for five years to collaborate with architects and landscape designers. In the master planning of the city his aim was to create a harmonic balance between the classical built form and the tropical landscape. He embraced and connected the city's road networks while accentuating prominent landmarks. His influence has left a huge mark on Havana although many of his ideas were cut short by the Great Depression in 1929. During the first decades of the 20th century Havana expanded more rapidly than at any time during its history. Great wealth prompted architectural styles to be influenced from abroad. The peak of Neoclassicism came with the construction of the Vedado district (begun in 1859). This area features a number of set back well-proportioned buildings in the Neoclassical style.

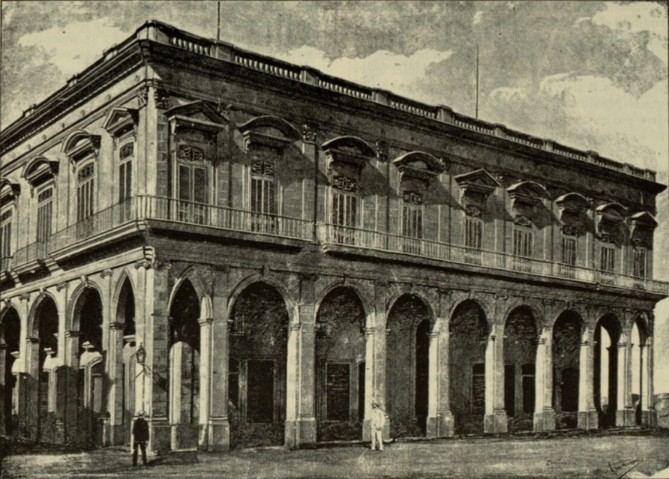
Palacio de Villalba, photo of 1898

Built in 1875, in the Reparto de las Las Murallas, (wide strip of land that remained after the city walls were demolished in 1863), it was the work of the architect Eugenio Rayneri y Sorrentino. (Note: Eugenio Rayneri y Sorrentino was the father of Eugenio Rayneri Piedra the architect of El Capitolio.) Around 1880 the mansion was owned by the Count of Casa Moré. The "La Flor de José Murias" tobacco factory was installed in the building. Later, through the exploitation of rents, it became a tenement house. In 1951 some of its spaces were dedicated to housing. On its upper floor, the Spanish Center and the Israeli Center of Cuba had their headquarters.

The palace of the Marquesa de Villalba and the Mercado de Tacón were designed by the Eugenio Rayneri y Sorrentino at almost the same time, 1875 and 1876, respectively, each in a style that accommodated the particular typology (residential and commercial) thus conceiving each work with the formal element accommodating different aesthetic requirements. The property is, after the Aldama Palace, the strongest example of Cuban Neoclassicism. The palace of the Marquesa de Villalba is in the neoclassical style, perhaps only comparable in Havana – according to Alina Castellanos – to the Aldama Palace. But while the latter limits the decoration to the natural slenderness of the colonnade, in the most classical way of the Greek Parthenon, the former uses Roman and Renaissance elaborations, hence, the arcade has been projected on pillars, the building was crowned with a considerable cornice. The neoclassical decoration can also be seen in the window covers, which take alternate forms of a triangular or semicircular pediment, and glass over the door, similar to the Plaza del Vapor.

The Palacio de Aldama is a neoclassical mansion located diagonally opposite to the old Plaza del Vapor (Parque del Curita), and in front of the old Campo de Marte; present day Parque de la Fraternidad, in Havana, Cuba. Built in 1840 by the Dominican architect and engineer Manuel José Carrera, its main facade of columns spans one block on Calle Amistad between Calles Reina and Estrella.

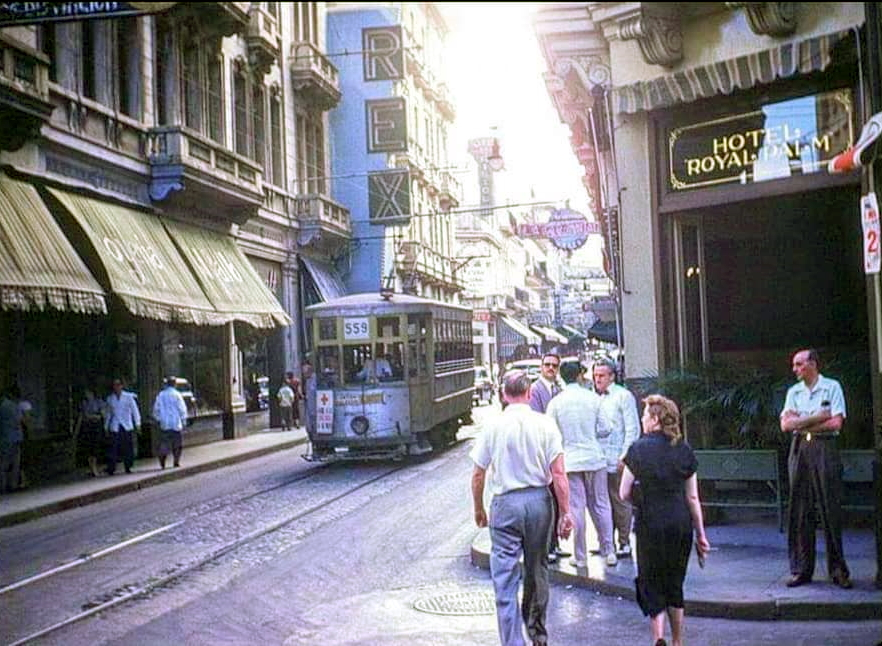
Royal Palm Hotel (Havana), entrance, c. 1930

The Royal Palm Hotel is located on the corner of San Rafael and Industria. It was inaugurated as "Edificio Luis. E. del Valle", in honor of the sugar magnate who owned the building. It was soon sold to Canadian Wilbur E. Todgham, however, who turned it into the famed Royal Palm Hotel. The commercial function of the ground floor has been preserved to date, taking advantage of its excellent location on Boulevard de San Rafael. Taking into account the architectural values of this building and its socio-cultural importance within the urban landscape in which it is located, the building received a major restoration in 2000, with the support of the Provincial Council of Seville, Spain.

==== Art deco ====
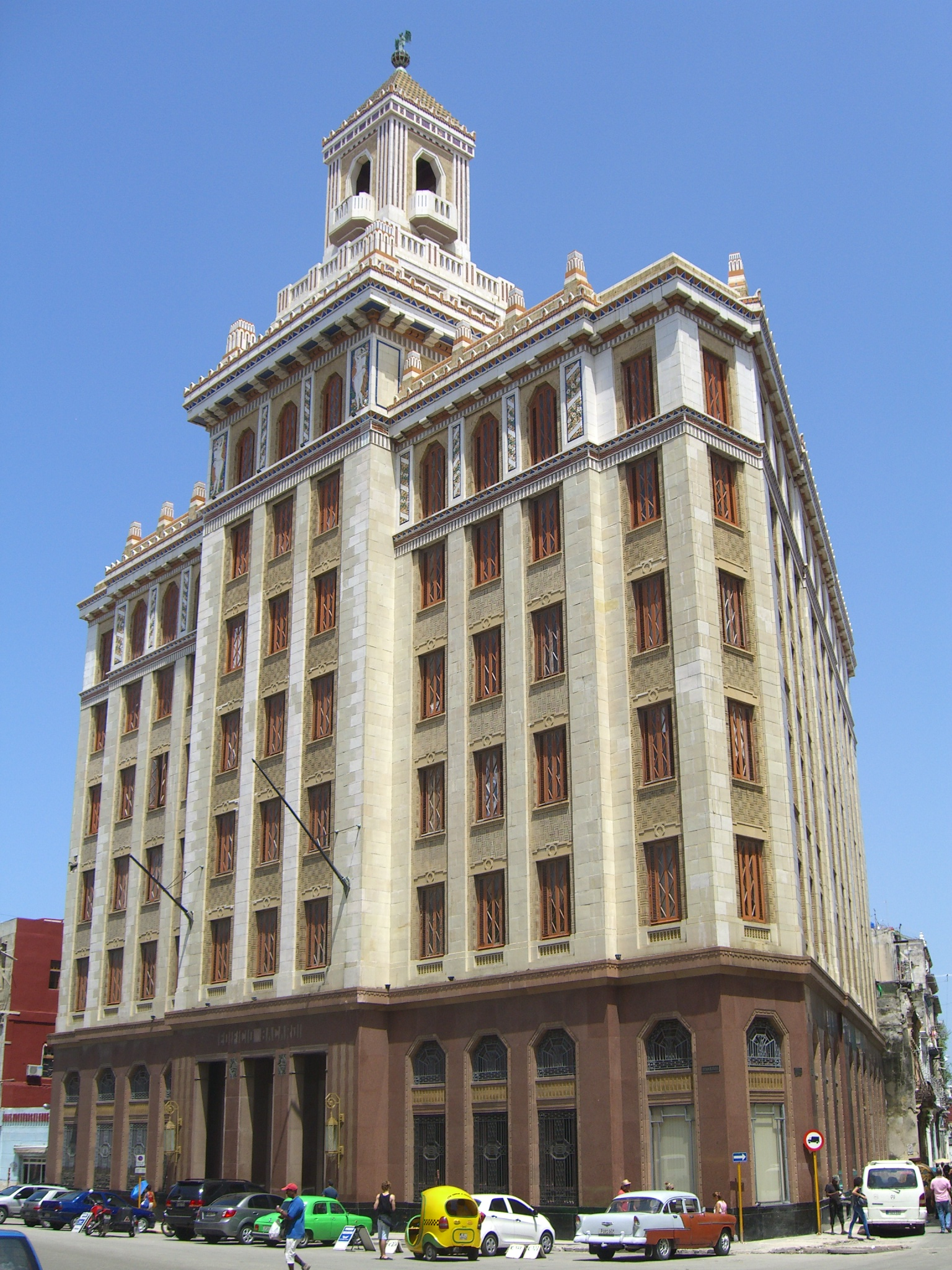
Bacardí Building

The Bacardi Building (Edificio Bacardí) is Havana landmark designed by the architects Esteban Rodríguez-Castells and Rafael Fernández Ruenes and completed in 1930. It is located on the corner of Calles Monserrate and San Juan de Dios on a 1,320 sq meter lot in Las Murallas, Old Havana. The building is in the art deco style that was popular internationally in the early decades of the 20th century. The Bacardi Building was designed to be the headquarters for the Bacardi Rum Company; it was nationalized by the Castro government in the early 1960s. In 2001, the building was restored by an Italian construction firm. The interior retains the original decorations in marble and granite. It is regarded as one of the finest Art Deco buildings in Latin America.

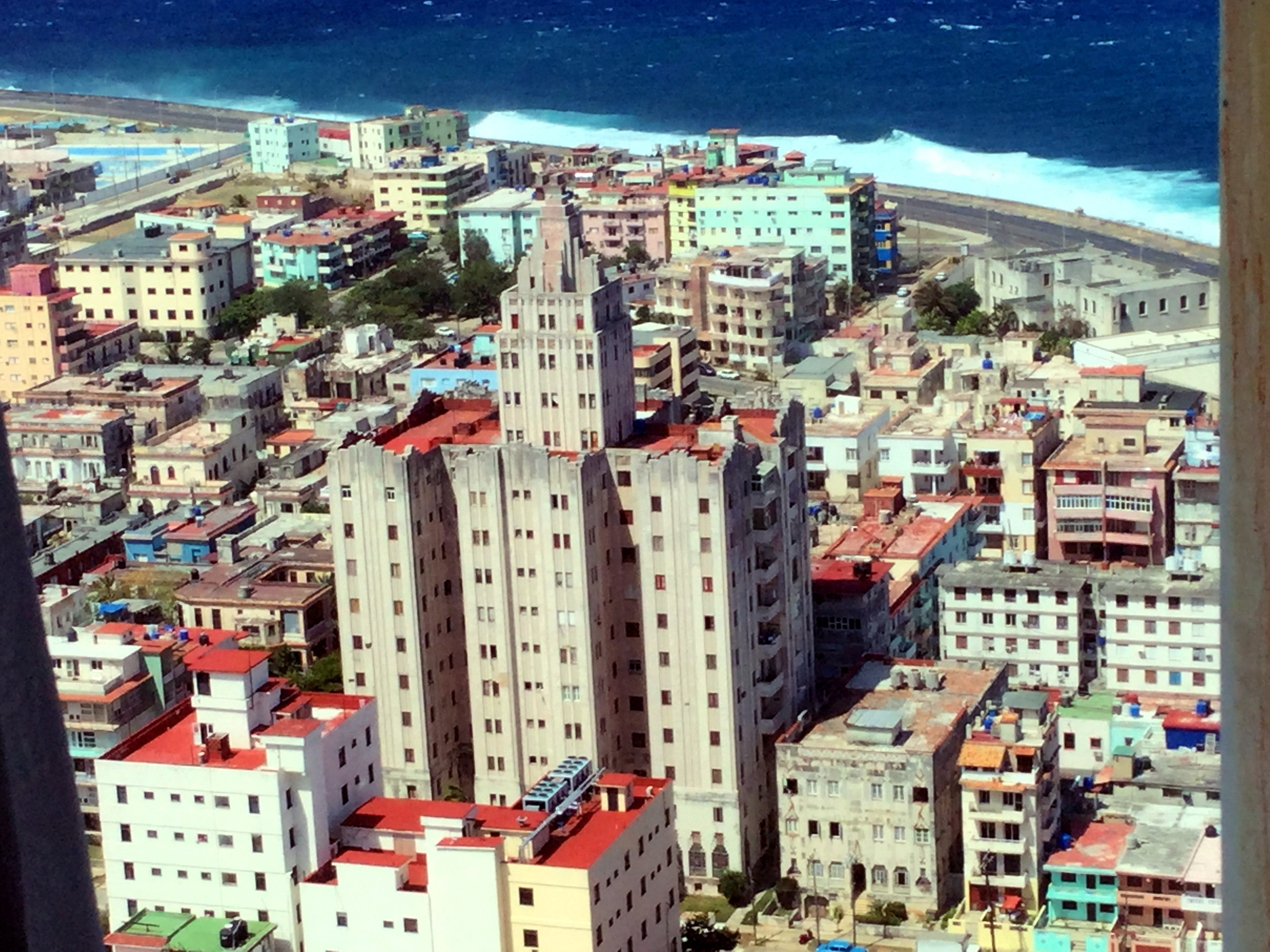
López Serrano Building

Designed by the architect Ricardo Mira in 1929, who in 1941 designed La Moderna Poesia bookstore on Obispo Street for the same owner, the López Serrano Building was the tallest residential building in Cuba until the construction of the FOCSA Building in 1956. The construction of the building was promoted by José Antonio López Serrano, a publisher who ran La Moderna Poesía.

==== Modernism ====
Known by buildings of high-quality, modernist architecture transformed much of the city. Examples are the Havana Hilton Hotel of (1958), the Radiocentro CMQ Building of 1955 by Martín Domínguez Esteban architect of the FOCSA Building in 1956, and the Edificio del Seguro Médico, Havana by Antonio Quintana Simonetti.

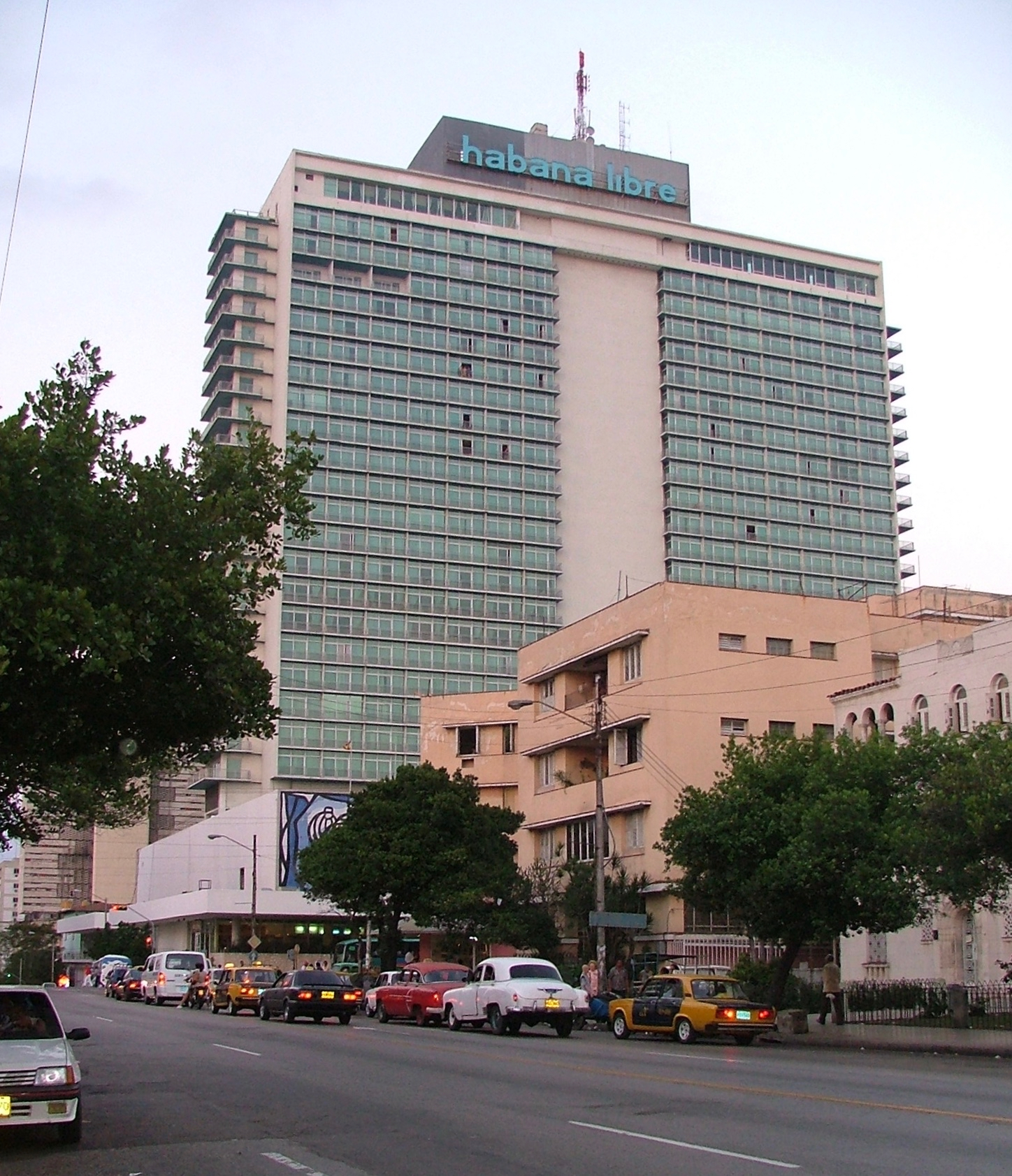
Hotel Habana Libre is located in the most central corner of Vedado.

Hotel Tryp Habana Libre is one of the larger hotels in Cuba, situated in Vedado, Havana. The hotel has 572 rooms in a 25-floor tower at Calle 23 ("La Rampa") and Calle L. Opened in 1958 as the Habana Hilton, the hotel famously served as the residence of Fidel Castro and other revolutionaries throughout 1959, after their capture of Havana. The Habana Hilton was constructed at a cost of $24 million, under the personal auspices of President Fulgencio Batista. It was built as an investment by the Caja de Retiro y Asistencia Social de los Trabajadores Gastronomicos, the pension plan of the Cuban catering workers' union, with additional financing from the Banco de Fomento Agricola e Industrial de Cuba (BANFAIC). It was operated by the American Hilton Hotels International group and was designed by the well-known Los Angeles architect Welton Becket, who had previously designed the Beverly Hilton for the chain. Becket designed the 27-story Habana Hilton in collaboration with Havana-based architects Lin Arroyo, and Gabriela Menéndez. Arroyo was the Minister of Public Works under Batista. The hotel was constructed by the Frederick Snare Corporation.

The Radiocentro CMQ Building complex is a former radio and television production facility and office building at the intersection of Calle L and La Rampa in El Vedado, Cuba. It was modeled after Raymond Hood's 1933 Rockefeller Center in New York City. With 1,650 seats, the theater first opened on 23 December 1947, under the name Teatro Warner Radiocentro, it was owned by brothers Goar and Abel Mestre. Today the building serves as the headquarters of the Cuban Institute of Radio and Television (ICRT). For the construction of this building, the Havana building authorities granted a permit in 1947 amending the ordinances that were then in effect in El Vedado prohibiting the construction of buildings of more than three storeys. This statute was modified six years later to expand the construction of up to four floors because many planners and owners claimed the need to authorize them to build taller buildings in the area.

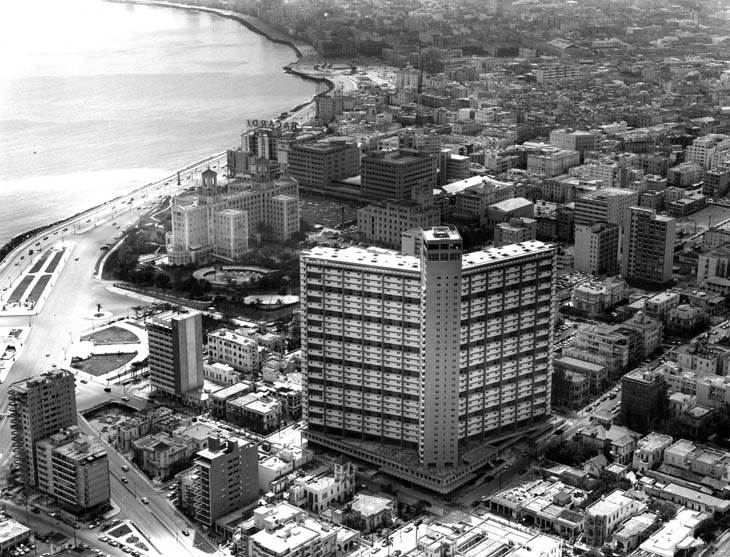
Aerial view of the FOCSA building from the west, with the floating corridors, ca. 1958

The FOCSA Building is a residential block in the Vedado neighborhood of Havana, Cuba. It was named after the contracting company Fomento de Obras y Construcciones, Sociedad Anónima, and the architects were Ernesto Gómez Sampera (1921–2004), Mercedes Diaz (his wife), and Martín Domínguez Esteban (1897–1970), who was the architect of the Radiocentro CMQ Building. The structural engineer was Luis Sáenz Duplace, of the firm Sáenz, Cancio & Martín, and professor of engineering at the University of Havana. The civil engineers were Bartolome Bestard and Manuel Padron. Gustavo Becquer and Fernando H. Meneses were the mechanical and electrical engineers, respectively. It is located on a site bordered by Calles 17 and M and Calles 19 and N in the Vedado. The Edificio Focsa (1956) represents Havana's economic dominance at the time. This 35-story complex was conceived and based on Corbusian ideas of a self-contained city within a city. It contained 400 apartments, garages, a school, a supermarket, and a restaurant on the top floor. This was the tallest high-strength concrete structure in the world at the time (using no steel frame).

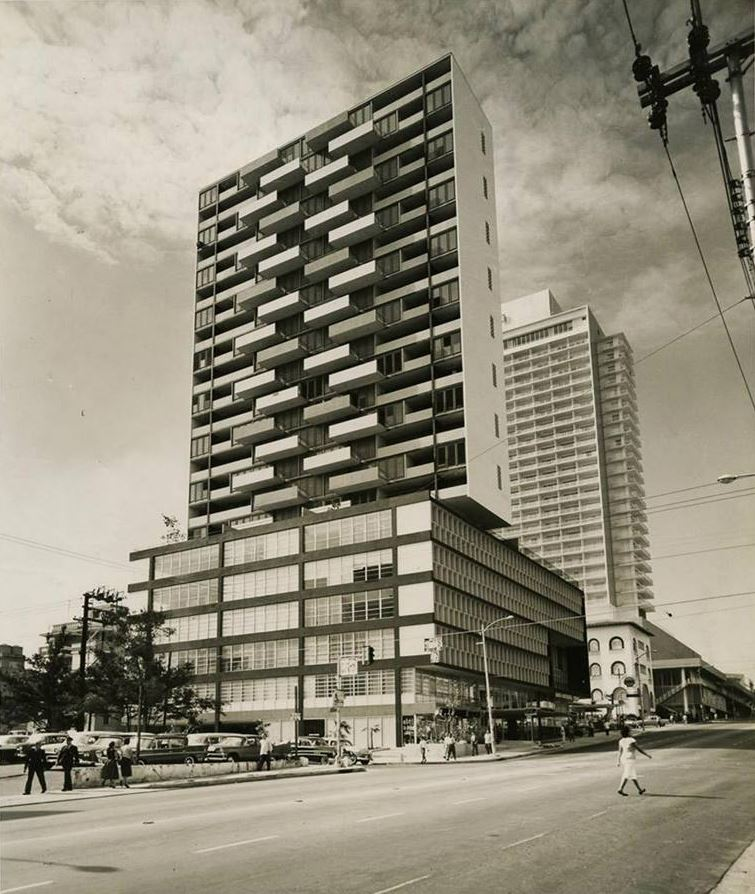
Antonio Quintana Simonetti Edificio del Seguro Médico, Havana, 1958

The Edificio del Seguro Médico is a commercial building in El Vedado, Havana. Built between 1955 and 1958, it was designed as a mixed use building for apartments and offices for the headquarters of the National Medical Insurance Company by Antonio Quintana Simonetti.

==== Cityscape ====
A map of Havana's 15 districts

Contemporary Havana can essentially be described as three cities in one: Old Havana, Vedado, and the newer suburban districts. Old Havana, with its narrow streets and overhanging balconies, is the traditional center of part of Havana's commerce, industry, and entertainment, as well as being a residential area.

To the west a newer section, centered on the uptown area known as Vedado, has become the rival of Old Havana for commercial activity and nightlife. The Capitolio Nacional building marks the beginning of Centro Habana, a working-class neighborhood that lies between Vedado and Old Havana. Barrio Chino and the Real Fabrica de Tabacos Partagás, one of Cuba's oldest cigar factories is located in the area.

A third Havana is that of the more affluent residential and industrial districts that spread out mostly to the west. Among these is Marianao, one of the newer parts of the city, dating mainly from the 1920s. Some of the suburban exclusivity was lost after the revolution, many of the suburban homes having been nationalized by the Cuban government to serve as schools, hospitals, and government offices. Several private country clubs were converted to public recreational centers. Miramar, located west of Vedado along the coast, remains Havana's exclusive area; mansions, foreign embassies, diplomatic residences, upscale shops, and facilities for wealthy foreigners are common in the area. The International School of Havana is located in the Miramar neighborhood.

In the 1980s many parts of Old Havana, including the Plaza de Armas, became part of a projected 35-year multimillion-dollar restoration project, for Cubans to appreciate their past and boost tourism. In the past ten years, with the assistance of foreign aid and under the support of local city historian Eusebio Leal Spengler, large parts of Habana Vieja have been renovated. The city is moving forward with their renovations, with most of the major plazas (Plaza Vieja, Plaza de la Catedral, Plaza de San Francisco and Plaza de Armas) and major tourist streets (Obispo and Mercaderes) near completion.

=== Visual arts ===
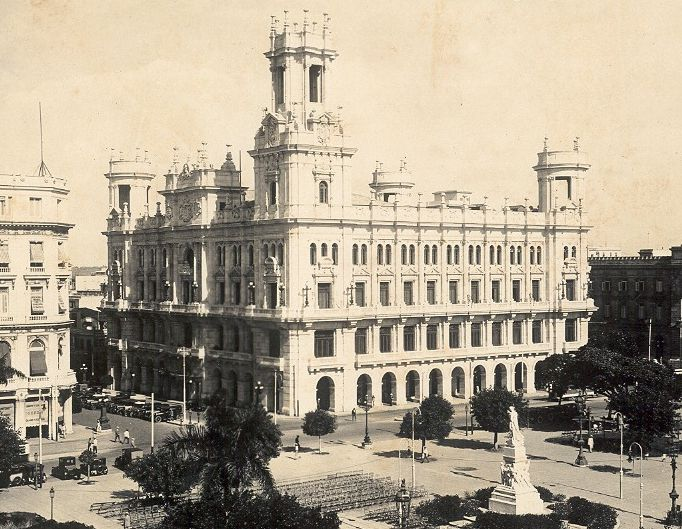
Museo Nacional de Bellas Artes, photo of 1927

The Museo Nacional de Bellas Artes de La Habana is a Fine Arts museum that exhibits Cuban and international art. The museum houses one of the largest collections of paintings and sculpture from Latin America and is the largest in the Caribbean region. Under the Cuban Ministry of Culture, it occupies two locations in the vicinity of Havana's Paseo del Prado, these are the Palace of Fine Arts, devoted to Cuban art and the Palace of the Asturian Center, dedicated to universal art. Its artistic heritage is made up of over 45,000 pieces. Since 1995 the capital hosts the headquarters of the Ludwig Foundation of Cuba in Vedado, founded by the German collectors Peter and Irene Ludwig, it is a non-governmental and non-profit organization for the dissemination and protection of Cuban art. Notable artists associated with the city include Federico Beltrán Masses, Víctor Manuel García Valdés, and Wifredo Lam.

=== Performing arts ===
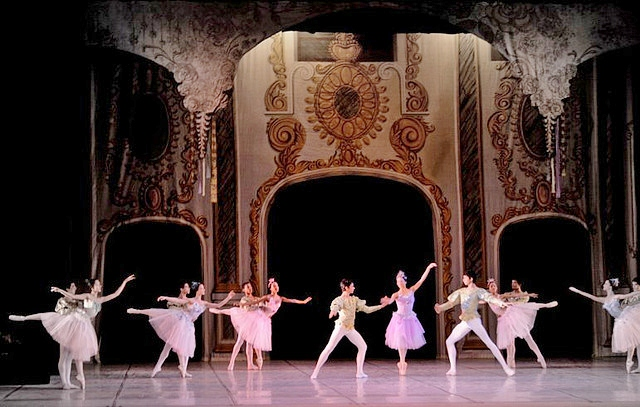
The Ballet Nacional de Cuba performing at the Gran Teatro de La Habana

Facing Havana's Central Park is the baroque Gran Teatro de La Habana, a prominent theater built in 1837. It is now home of the National Ballet of Cuba and the International Ballet Festival of Havana, one of the oldest in the New World. The façade of the building is adorned with a stone and marble statue. There are also sculptural pieces by Giuseppe Moretti, representing allegories depicting benevolence, education, music and theater. The principal theater is the García Lorca Auditorium, with seats for 1,500 and balconies. Glories of its rich history; the Italian tenor Enrico Caruso sang, the Russian ballerina Anna Pavlova danced, and the French Sarah Bernhardt acted.

Alicia Alonso was a Cuban prima ballerina assoluta and choreographer whose company became the Ballet Nacional de Cuba in 1955. Alonso was born "on the outskirts" of Havana in 1920 She is best known for her portrayals of Giselle and the ballet version of Carmen.

=== Radio and television ===
==== CMQ ====
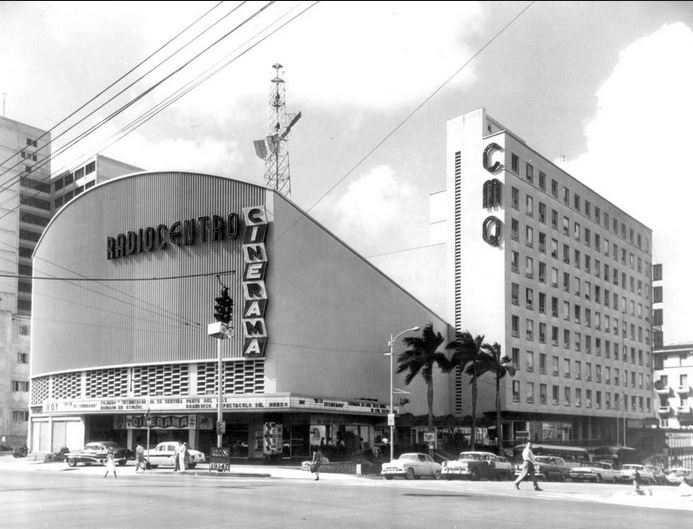
The Radiocentro CMQ Building, Havana

CMQ was a Cuban radio and television station located in Havana, Cuba, reaching an audience in the 1940s and 1950s, attracting viewers and listeners with a program that ranged from music and news dissemination. It later expanded into radio and television networks. As a radio network it was a heated competitor of the RHC-Cadena Azul network. The company was founded on March 12, 1933, by Miguel Gabriel and Ángel Cambó. In August 1943, half of it was acquired by the business group of Goar Mestre. In the beginning, it transmitted only in Havana, expanding later to the rest of Cuba.

Pre-revolutionary Cuba was an early adopter of new technology, including TV. Cuba was the first Latin American country to have television. In December 1946 station CM-21P conducted an experimental multi-point live broadcast.

Regular commercial broadcasting began in October 1950 with Gaspar Pumarejo's Unión Radio TV. This was followed by Goar Mestre Espinosa's CMQ-TV on channel 6 on 18 December 1950. CMQ officially launched on 11 March 1951, and would become an NBC affiliate. By 1954, CMQ-TV had expanded into a seven station network. With the CMQ network, Cuba was the second country in the world, only after the United States, to have a national TV network.

At the beginning of the 1950s with the transmission of the novel El Derecho de Nacer, by Felix B. Caignet, displaced the competing station, RHC Cadena Azul. It is with this leadership that the second Cuban television channel, CMQ TV, Channel 6 is born. It was initially located on Calle Monte, on the corner of Paseo del Prado. On 12 March 1948, the radio studio was moved to the Radiocentro building in La Rampa and Calle L in El Vedado.

=== Festivals ===
==== Film Festival ====
The Havana Film Festival is a Cuban festival that focuses on the promotion of Latin American filmmakers. It is also known in Spanish as Festival Internacional del Nuevo Cine Latinoamericano de La Habana, and in English as International Festival of New Latin American Cinema of Havana. It takes place every year during December in the city of Havana, Cuba.

The inaugural International Festival of New Latin American Cinema was held on 3 December 1979, and more than 600 film directors of Latin America responded to the first call made by the Cuban Institute of the Cinematographic Art and Industry (ICAIC). Its founders the included President of ICAIC, Alfredo Guevara, and the filmmakers Julio García Espinosa and Pastor Vega.

As expressed in its founding convocation, the festival aimed to "promote the regular meeting of Latin American filmmakers who with their work enrich the artistic culture of our countries (…); ensure the joint presentation of fiction films, documentaries, cartoons and current events (…), and contribute to the international diffusion and circulation of the main and most significant productions of our cinematographies".

In 2013 the Havana Film Festival announced that it was reappointing Iván Giroud as its president. Giroud had previously served as president from 1994 to 2010.

== Health ==
All Cuban residents have free access to health care in hospitals, local polyclinics, and neighborhood family doctors who serve on average 170 families each, which is one of the highest doctor-to-patient ratios in the world. The health system has suffered from shortages of supplies, equipment and medications caused by ending of the Soviet Union subsidies in the early 1990s and the US embargo.

Havana's infant mortality rate in 2009 was 4.9 per 1,000 live births, 5.12 in the country as a whole, which is lower than many developed nations, and the lowest in the developing world. Administration of Cuba's health care system is centered largely in Havana. Hospitals in Havana are run by the national government. Citizens are assigned hospitals and clinics to which they may go for attention.

== Sports ==
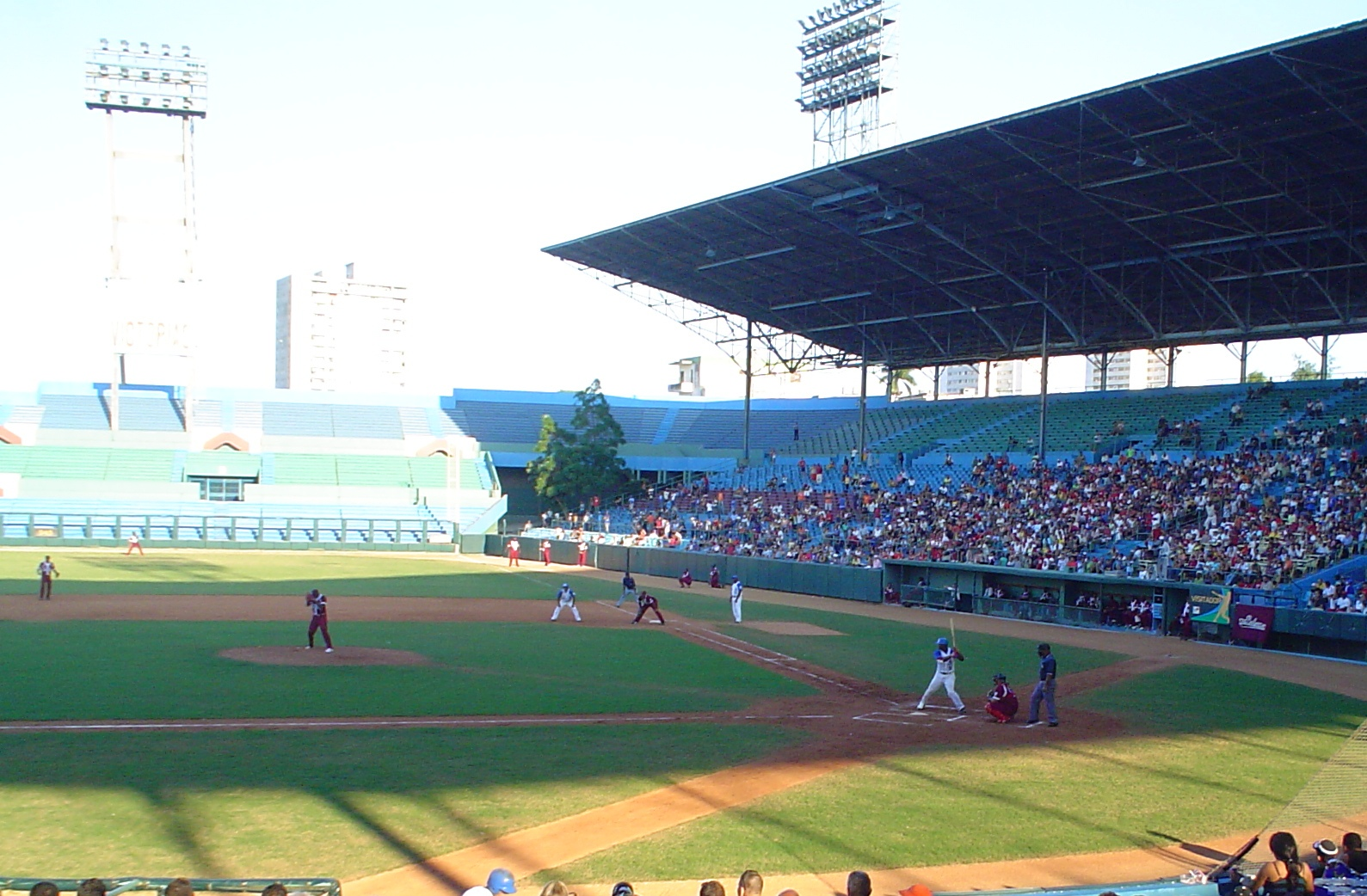
The Estadio Latinoamericano

Many Cubans are avid sports fans who particularly favor baseball. Havana's team in the Cuban National Series is Industriales, one of the most successful teams in the tournament. In the past, it has also been represented by Habana (in the pre-revolutionary Cuban League) as well as Metropolitanos and La Habana in the National Series.

The city has several large sports stadiums, the largest one being the Estadio Latinoamericano, where Industriales play. Admission to sporting events is generally free, and impromptu games are played in neighborhoods throughout the city. Social clubs at the beaches provide facilities for water sports and include restaurants and dance halls.

- Havana was host to the 11th Pan American Games in 1991. Stadiums and facilities for this were built in the relatively unpopulated eastern suburbs.
- Havana was host to the 1992 IAAF World Cup in Athletics.
- Havana was an applicant to host the 2008 Summer Olympics and 2012 Summer Olympics, but was not shortlisted.
- Havana hosted the Centrobasket on three occasions, namely in 1969, 1989 and 1999.

== See also ==
- History of Havana
- Old Havana
- Giuseppe Gaggini
- List of cities in the Caribbean
- Havana Plan Piloto
- Watson and the Shark

== Bibliography ==
- Eddie Lennon, Julie Napier and Farida Haqiqi. Wonderful Havana (1st ed.). Cool World Books, updated February 2013.
- King, Charles Spencer (2009) Havana My Kind of Town. US: CreateSpace. ISBN 978-1-4404-3269-9.
- Alicia García Santana. Havana: History and Architecture of a Romantic City. Monacelli, October 2000. ISBN 978-1-58093-052-9.
- Angela, Ferriol Maruaga; et al.: Cuba crisis, ajuste y situación social (1990–1996), Editorial de Ciencias Sociales, 1998. ISBN 978-959-06-0348-8.
- The Rough Guide to Cuba (3rd ed.). Rough Guides, May 2005. ISBN 978-1-84353-409-9.
- Barclay, Juliet (1993). Havana: Portrait of a City. London: Cassell. ISBN 978-1-84403-127-6 (2003 paperback edition). A comprehensive account of the history of Havana from the early 16th century to the end of the 19th century.
- Carpentier, Alejo. La ciudad de las columnas (The city of columns). A historical review of the city from one of the major authors in the iberoamerican literature, a native of this city.
- Cluster, Dick, & Rafael Hernández, History of Havana. New York: Palgrave-MacMillan, 2006. ISBN 978-1-4039-7107-4. A social history of the city from 1519 to the present, co-authored by a Cuban writer and editor resident in Havana and an American novelist and writer of popular history.
- Eguren, Gustavo. La fidelísima Habana (The very faithful Havana). A fundamental illustrated book for those who wants to know the history of La Habana, includes chronicles, articles from natives and non-natives, archives documents, and more.
- United Railways of Havana. Cuba: A Winter Paradise. 1908–1909, 1912–1913, 1914–1915 and 1915–1916 editions. New York, 1908, 1912, 1914 and 1915. Maps, photos and descriptions of suburban and interurban electric lines.
- "Electric Traction in Cuba". Tramway & Railway World (London), 1 April 1909, pp. 243–44. Map, photos and description of Havana Central Railroad.
- "The Havana Central Railroad". Electrical World (New York), 15 April 1909, pp. 911–12. Text, 4 photos.
- "Three-Car Storage Battery Train". Electric Railway Journal (New York), 28 September 1912, p. 501. Photo and description of Cuban battery cars.
- Berta Alfonso Gallol. Los Transportes Habaneros. Estudios Históricos. La Habana, 1991. The definitive survey (but no pictures or maps).
- James A. Michener and John Kings. Six Days in Havana. University of Texas Press; first edition (1989). ISBN 978-0-292-77629-6. Interviews with close to 200 Cubans of widely assorted backgrounds and positions, and concerns how the country has progressed after 90 years of independence from Spain and under the 30-year leadership of Castro.
- One more interesting note about that edition of The New York Times: On page 5, there is a short blurb mentioning, "The plan for holding a Pan-American exhibition at Buffalo has been shelved for the present owing to the unsettled condition of the public mind consequent upon the Spanish-Cuban complications." President William McKinley was assassinated at the Pan-American Exhibition when it was finally held in 1901.
- Cathryn Griffith, Havana Revisited: An Architectural Heritage. W. W. Norton 2010. ISBN 978-0-393-73284-9
- Guadalupe Garcia, Beyond the Walled City: Colonial Exclusion in Havana. 2015, Berkeley: University of California Press. ISBN 978-0-520-28604-7 (review).
- Baklanoff, Eric N. (1998). "Cuba on the Eve of the Socialist Transition: A Reassessment of the Backwardness-Stagnation Thesis". Cuba in Transition, Volume 8. Silver Spring, MD: ASCE. pp. 260–272. ISBN 978-0-9649082-7-7. Archived from the original on 6 April 2023.
- Smith, Kirby; Llorens, Hugo (1998). "Renaissance and Decay: A Comparison of Socioeconomic Indicators in Pre-Castro and Current-Day Cuba". Cuba in Transition, Volume 8. Silver Spring, MD: ASCE. pp. 247–259. ISBN 978-0-9649082-7-7. Archived from the original on 6 April 2023.
