= López Serrano Building =

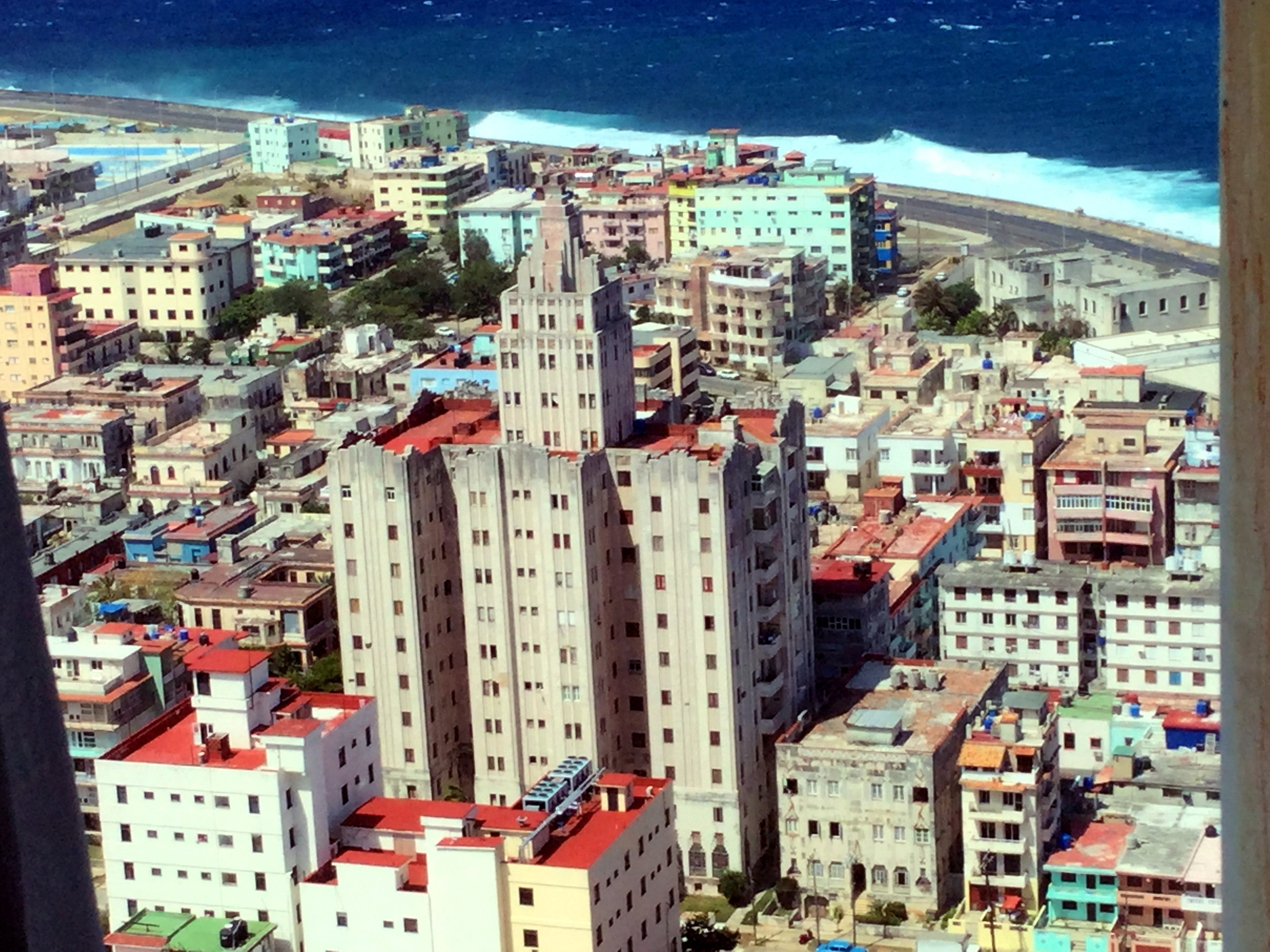
- As seen from the FOCSA Building corridor.
- Interactive map of the López Serrano Building area

General information
- Type: Residential
- Architectural style: Art deco
- Location: Vedado, 108 Calle 13 & L, Havana, Cuba
- Coordinates: 23°08′39.2″N 82°23′13.94″W
- Construction started: 1929
- Completed: 1932
- Owner: Revolutionary government

Height
- Architectural: 57.4 metres (188 ft)
- Tip: 65.61 metres (215.3 ft)
- Roof: Terracota tiles

Technical details
- Structural system: Steel frame
- Material: Brick, terracotta tile walls
- Floor count: 10 + 4 tower
- Floor area: 8,500 square metres (91,000 sq ft)
- Lifts/elevators: 3

Design and construction
- Architect: Ricardo Mira
- Structural engineer: Miguel Rosich
- Other designers: Enrique García Cabrera
- Main contractor: Watch and Rosich
- Known for: 1st Cuba skyscraper

Other information
- Number of rooms: 78 apts

The López Serrano Building was the tallest residential building in Cuba until the construction of the FOCSA in 1956. Designed by the architect Ricardo Mira in 1929, who in 1941 who also designed La Moderna Poesia bookstore on Obispo Street for the same owner, it is often compared to the Bacardi Building in Old Havana built two years before the López Serrano Building because of their similarity in massing and central tower. The congressman, senator, and presidential candidate Eduardo Chibás was living on the fourteenth-floor penthouse when he committed suicide in August 1951 on the air at CMQ Radio Station.

== History ==
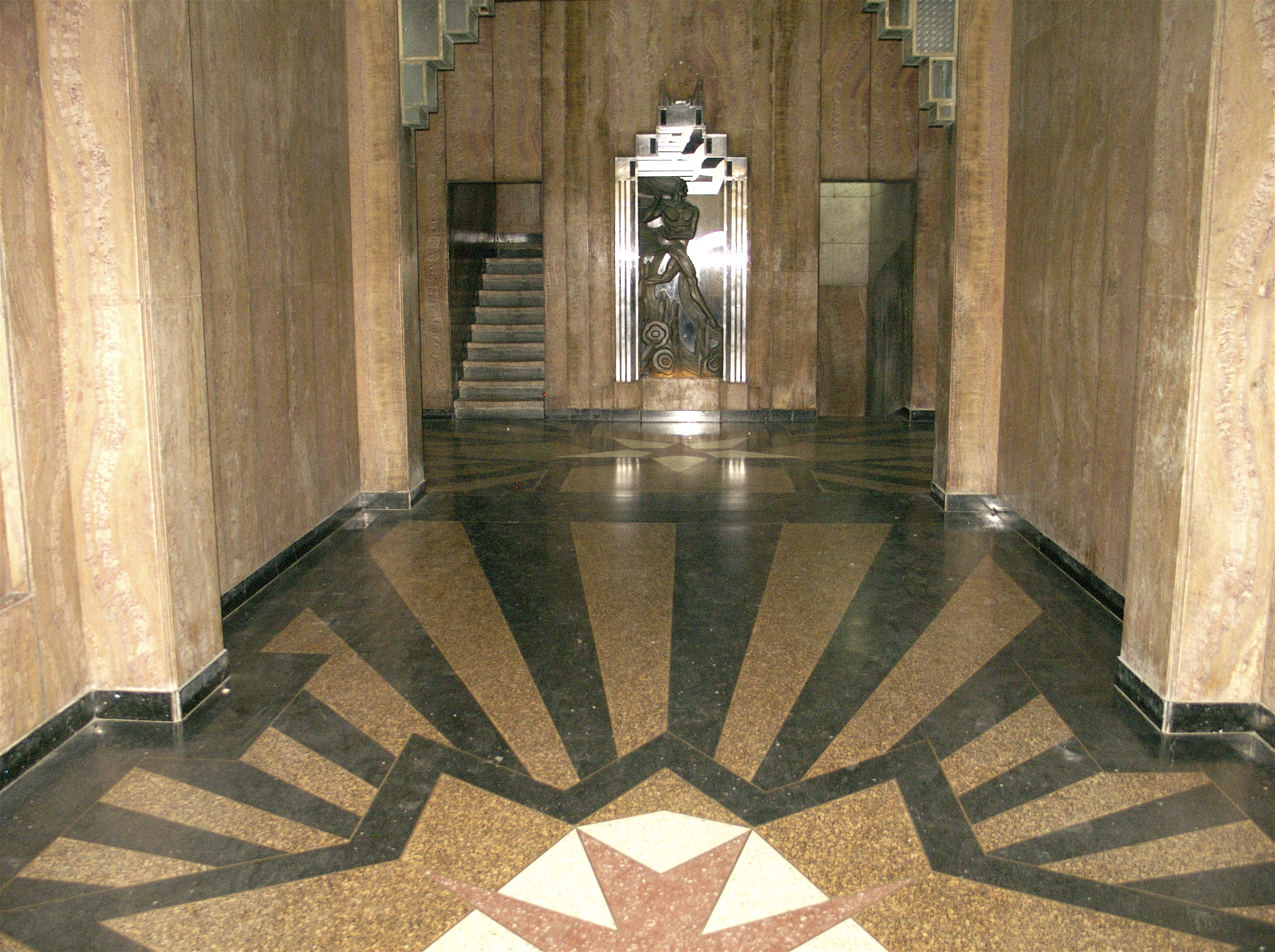
Lobby terrazzo floor

The construction of the building was promoted by José Antonio López Serrano, a publisher who ran La Moderna Poesía. He was the son of Ana Luísa Serrano and José López Rodríguez, "Pote", a banker with ties to publishing.

Pote arrived in Cuba as a poor and illiterate teenager who became an influential banker with ties to the government. In 1890 Pote married Ana Luísa Serrano, a wealthy widow who owned one of the best bookstores in Havana, La Moderna Poesía. After the marriage, Pote took charge of the business opening several branches in other locations in Cuba. José López's fortune was due not only to his advantageous marriage to Ana Luísa but also from supporting the Cuban independence cause. Relations with the main Cuban leaders would bring important economic benefits. Among these political alliances was the figure of General José Miguel Gómez, whom Pote financed the 1907 electoral campaign that would propel Gómez to the Presidency of the Republic. In 1908 Pote got an exclusive contract to print the tickets of the National Lottery, which translated into extensive financial benefits. He monopolized the printing of official documents such as bonds, stocks, stamps and bank notes, printed in La Casa del Timbre. Later, he would obtain from the Government of Gómez the concession for the construction of an iron bridge over the Almendares River connecting Calle Calzada with Miramar. José López Rodríguez committed suicide on March 28, 1921, at the time, he had accumulated 93 million dollars.

== Tower ==
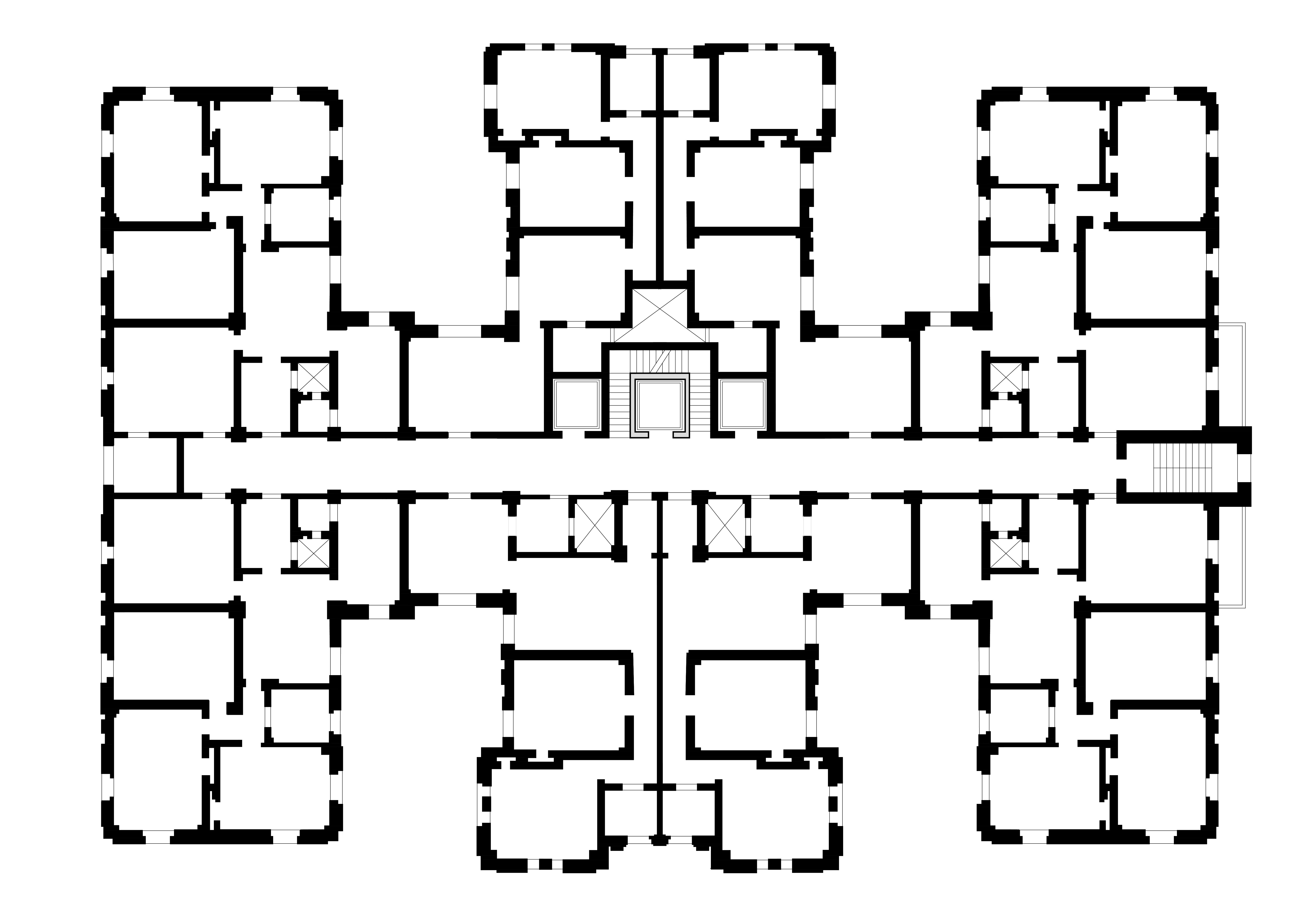
Typical floor plan of the Lopez Serrano Building

The López Serrano Building has a U.S. standard structural steel frame system. A36 steel, is a type of structural steel used as a system of construction that is commonly bolted or riveted. As the technology for riveting steel members was absent in Cuba, the frame of the López Serrano Building was welded in place and the reason for the high level of stiffness of the structure.

Above the ten stories in the main body of the building, centrally located, is a tower of four apartments supported by ten steel columns that protrude from the main mass. The ten-story block is subdivided into four aisles to allow for a stair, three elevators and a brick wall down the middle which further subdivides the block into two apartments. The two apartment blocks to the east and west, have a line of structural columns running down the middle which in turn subdivide the apartment. An interior public corridor runs perpendicular to the three blocks, parallel to Calle 13, and links to the stair and three elevators. There is secondary stairs near the east entrance with windows at every landing. There were no fire stairs required by the Havana building code. The four luxury tower apartments were occupied by José Antonio López Serrano who lived on the top floor, it was later occupied by Eduardo Chibás.

== Walls ==
The exterior walls are brick with one inch, integral color cement plaster finish. There are raised plaster ornaments on the exterior walls and inscribed lines in the plaster suggesting a masonry bond in the lower part of the wall. There are also terracotta design panels inserted over some of the openings. All the windows and doors of the building are wood and glass in a wood frame. The floor of the apartments are covered with tiles with red and green geometric designs, there are tile baseboards. The interior walls are terracotta tile and covered in cement plaster. The floor of the lobby, the porch, and entrances to the building have ornate designs in red and black or red and green terrazzo. The walls of the lobby are Moroccan, book matched, red marble panels. There is a nickel-silver relief El Tiempo (‘Time’) by graphic designer Enrique García Cabrera on the elevator wall of the lobby. The elevator doors are pivot hinged and originally were nickel silver with various Art Deco designs.

== Distribution ==
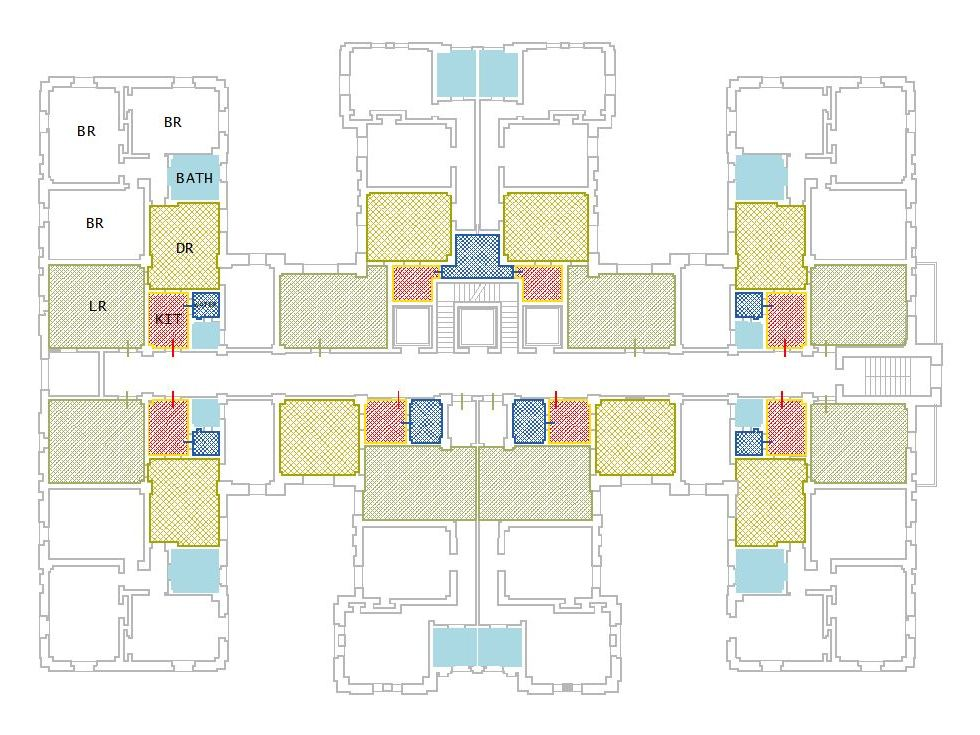
Room layout within apartments. Typical floor plan

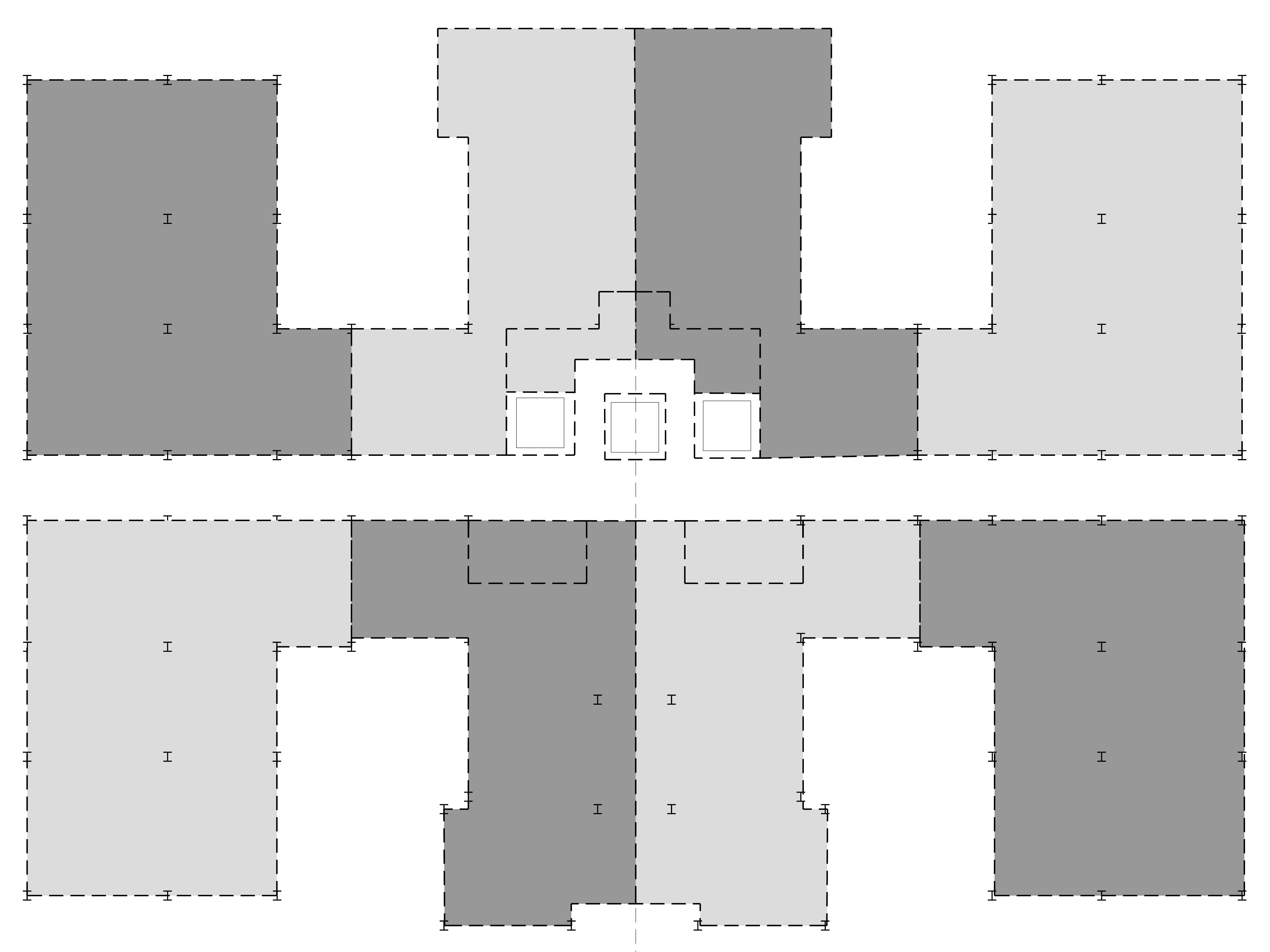
Apartment distribution per floor

As per Havana zoning laws, the ground floor was required to have a porch facing 13th Street. It also had to provide public, commercial establishments. To this end, the building had various stores, a barbershop, restaurants and coffee shops. The distribution of the upper floors is as follows: from the second to the tenth floor, the building has eight apartments per floor, six with a separate service entrance opening directly into the kitchen and service area. Each apartment has access from the kitchen to what is called in Havana a "patio" (dark blue), this is an area equipped with a sink for doing laundry. A similar room labeled a patio can also be found in other modernist buildings such as the FOCSA Building of 1956 and the apartments at the Edificio del Seguro Médico of 1958 on La Rampa. The four apartments in the center have two bedrooms each. The east and west apartments have three bedrooms each and an extra small maid's bedroom located next to the kitchen with a toilet and a shower. Each apartment has a small bathroom with a window close to the bedrooms. The main entrance door to the apartment opens directly into the living room. Only the apartments in the center block have a short corridor connecting the bedrooms. This shortage of corridors in the design mandates that the circulation occurs mostly through the rooms thus decreasing their effective square footage. The dining room is connected to the kitchen and the patio. The center apartments on the south side have a smaller entry vestibule. Every apartment was originally provided with modern amenities: hot and cold water, gas, radio, and telephone service. The López Serrano Building was the country's first co-operative apartment corporation.

== Gallery ==
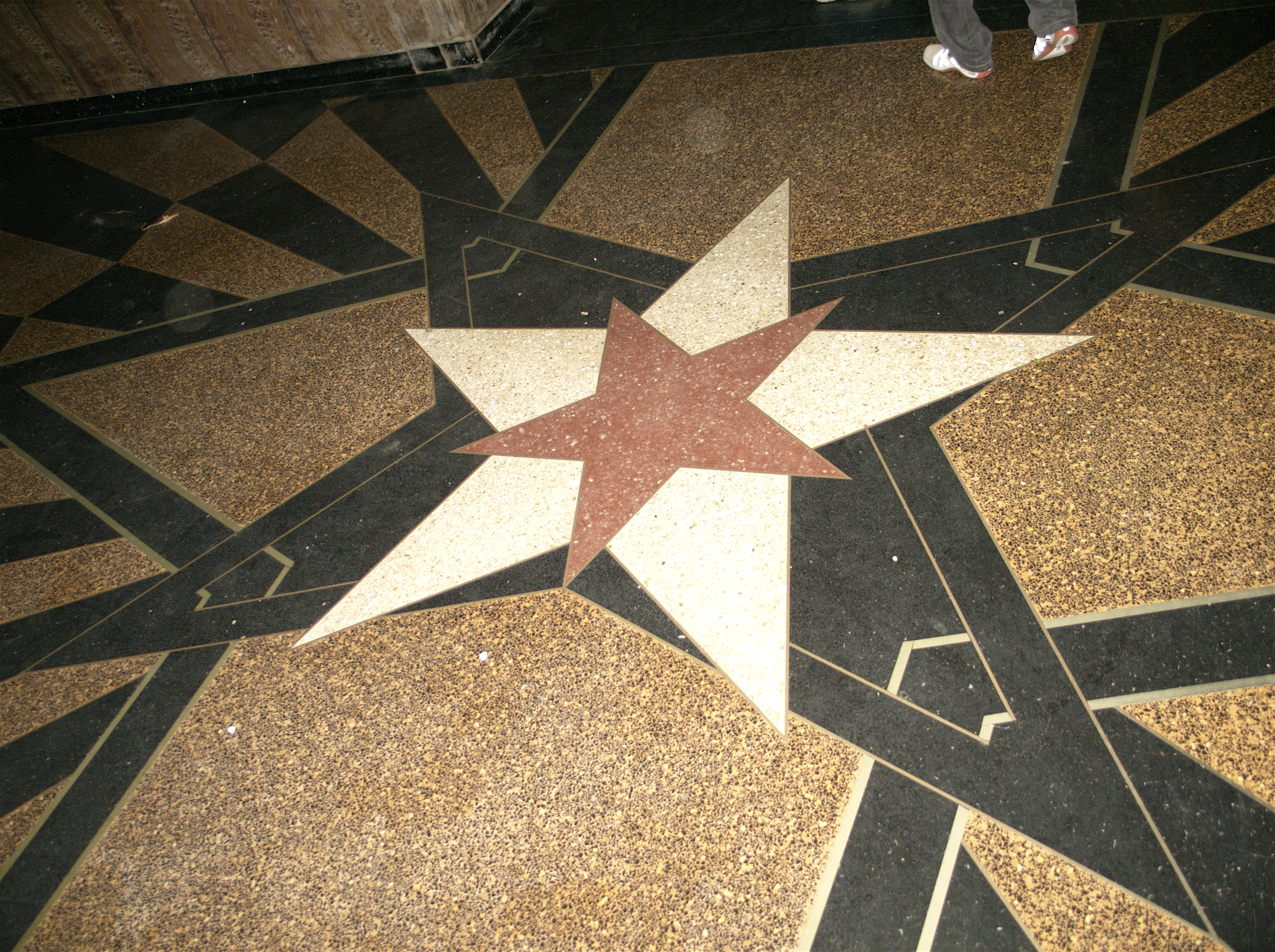

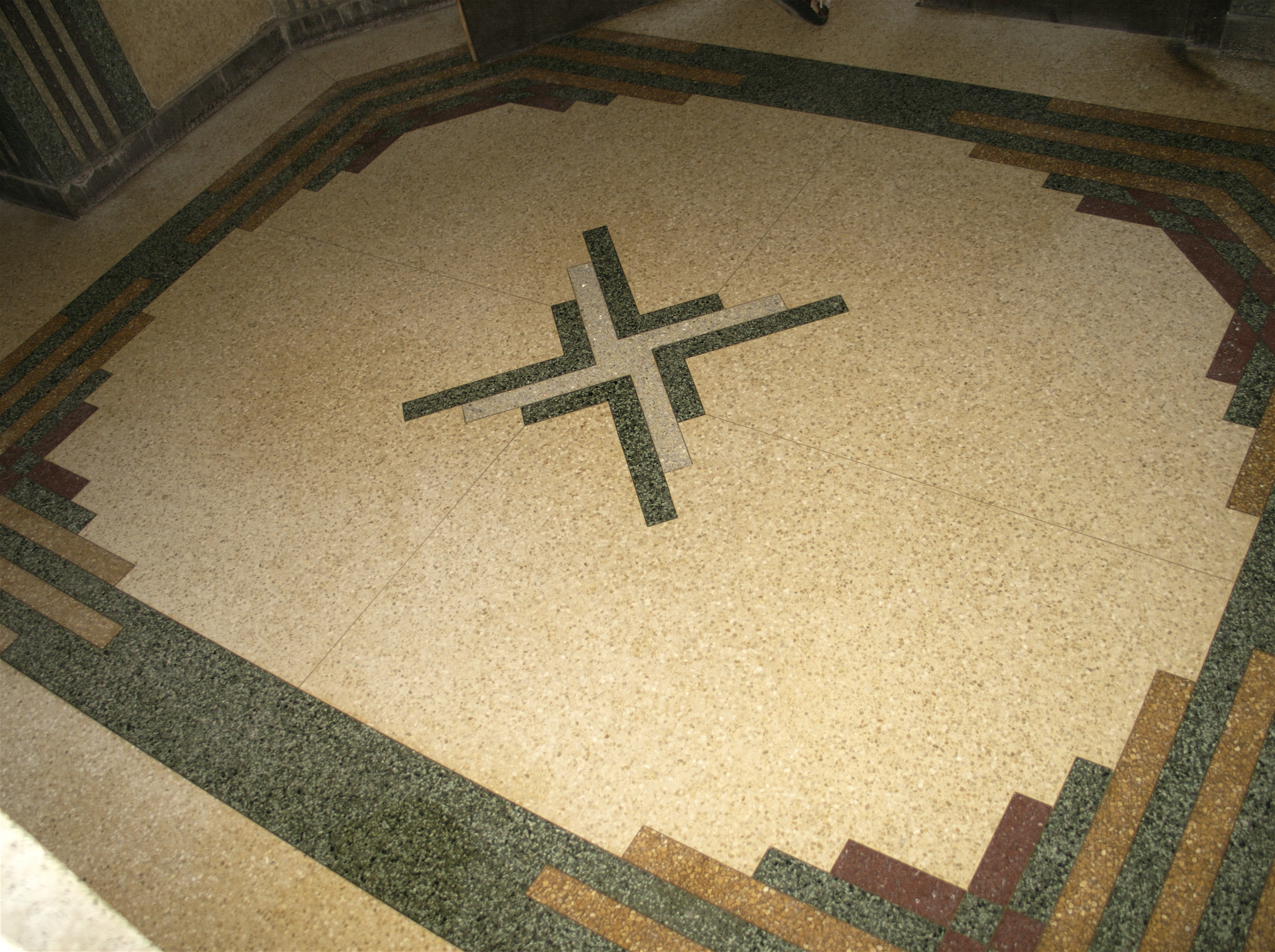

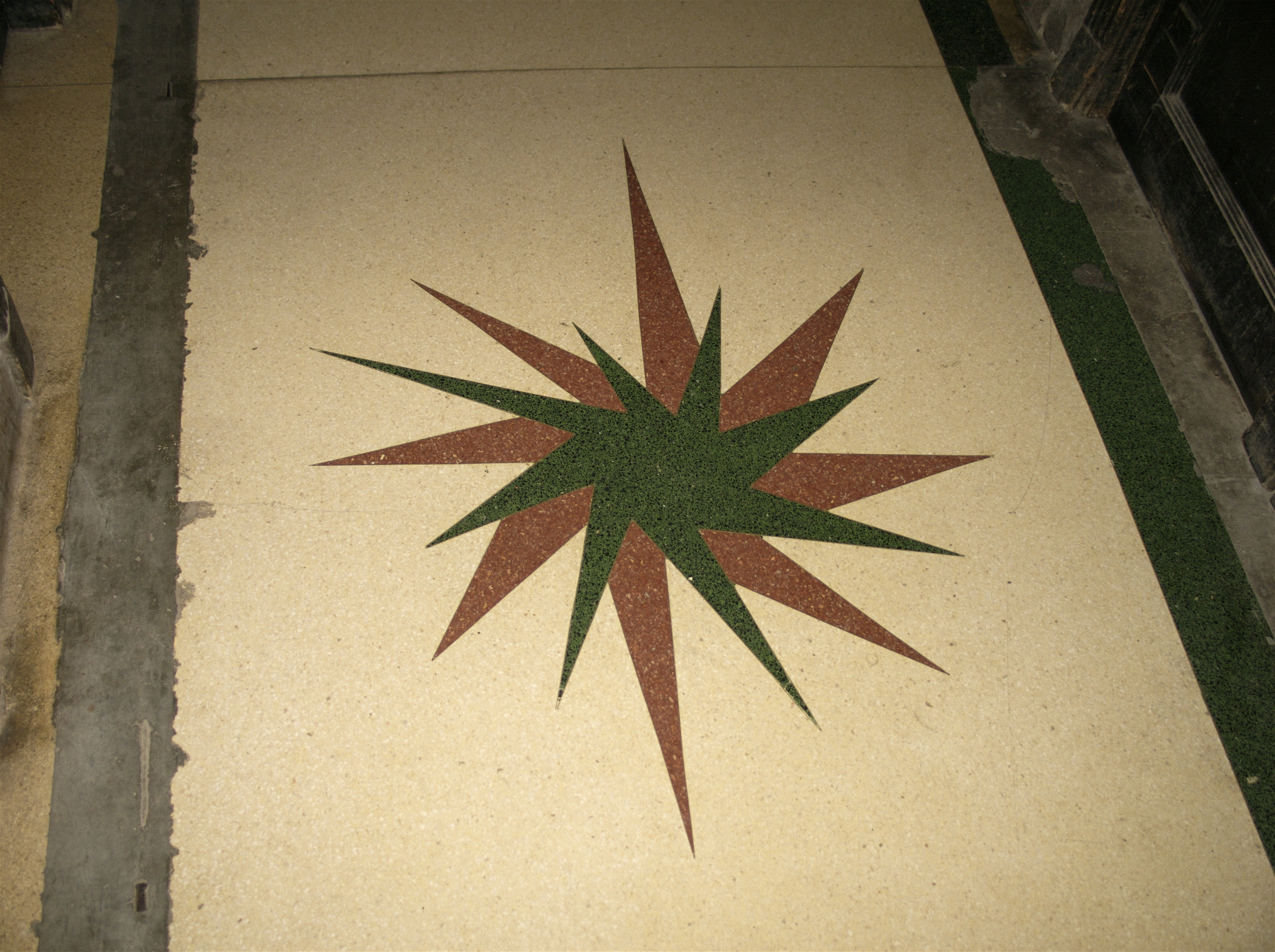

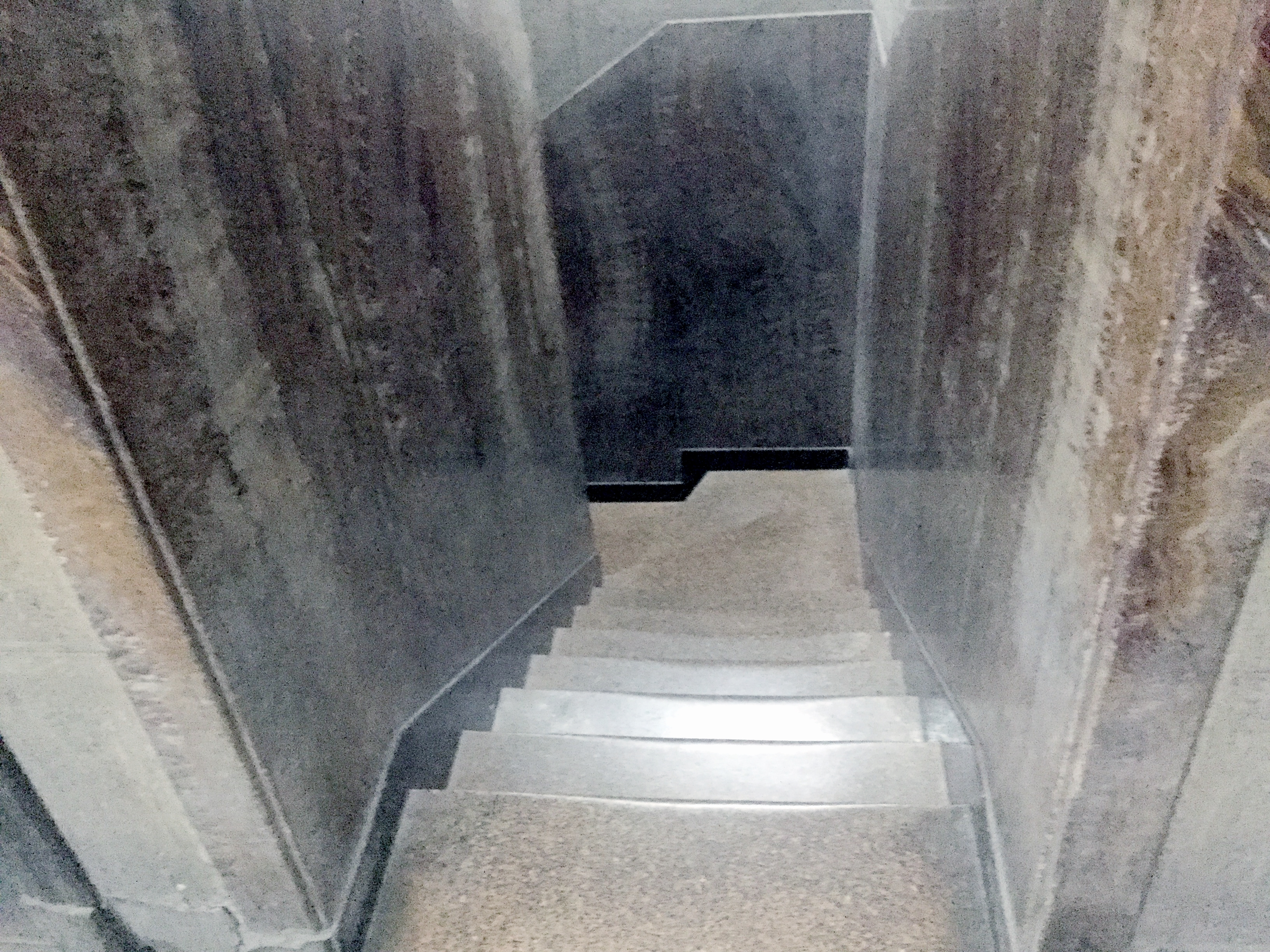
Stairs behind elevator to basement.

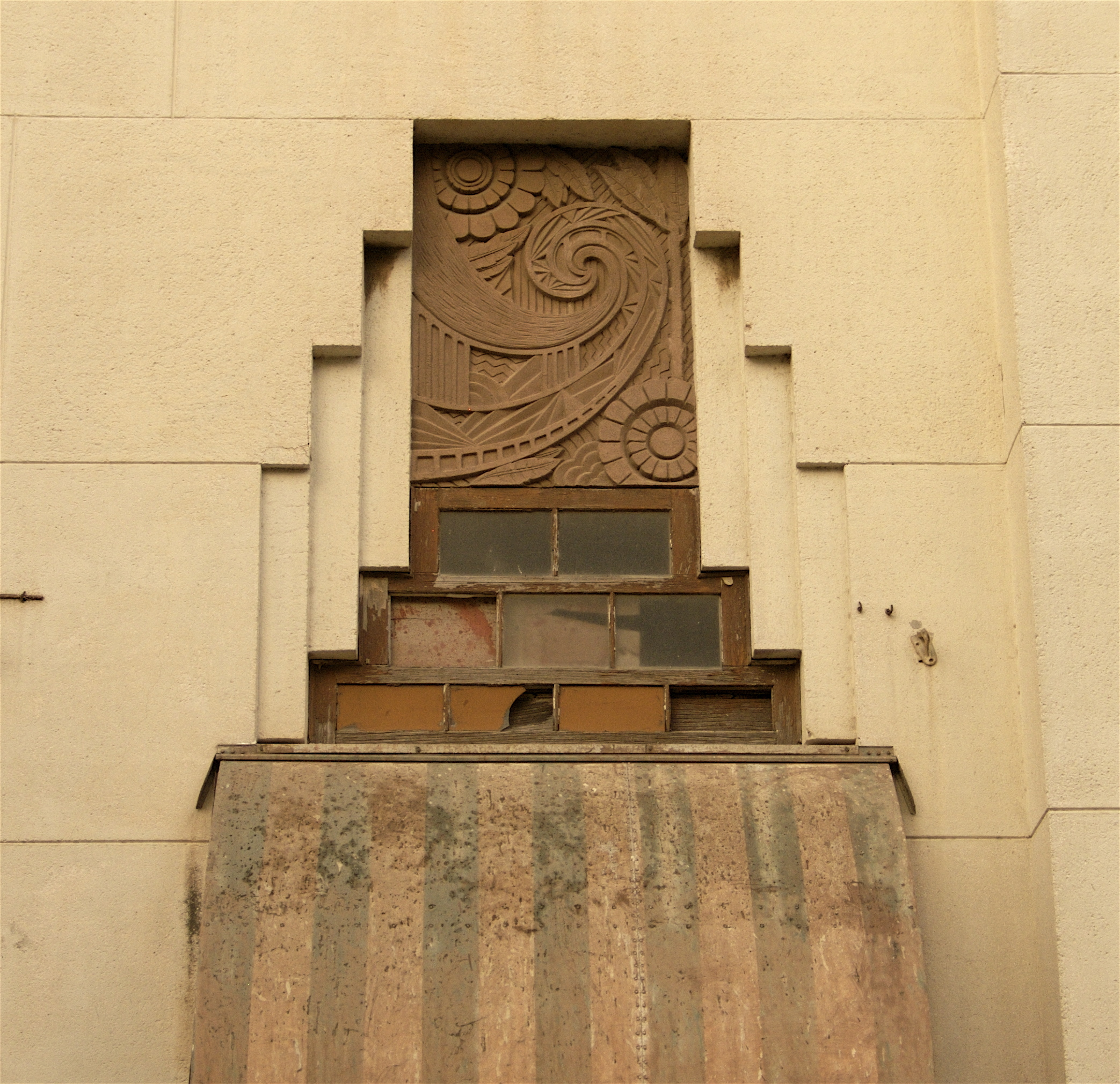

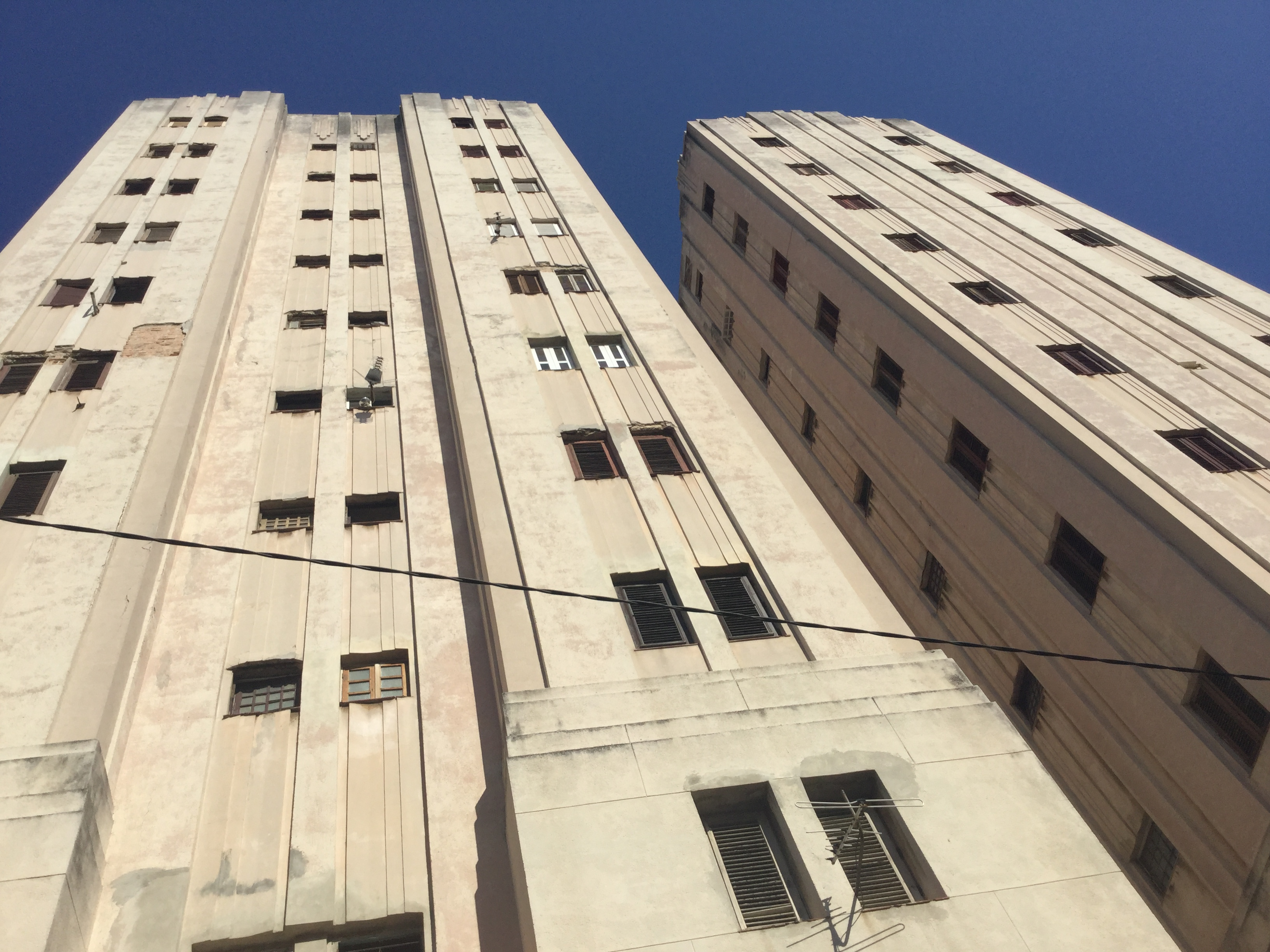
Calle 13

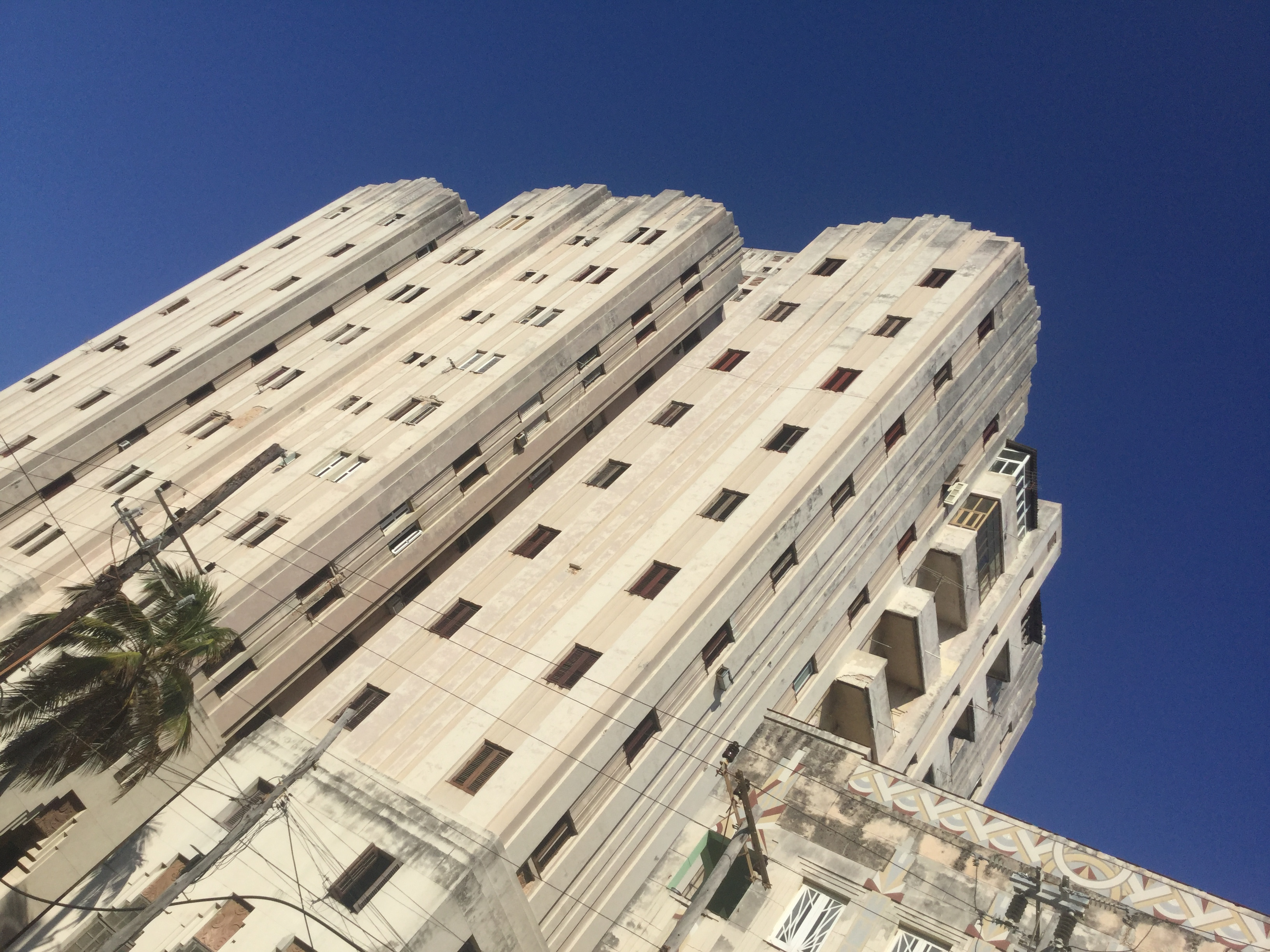
Calle 13

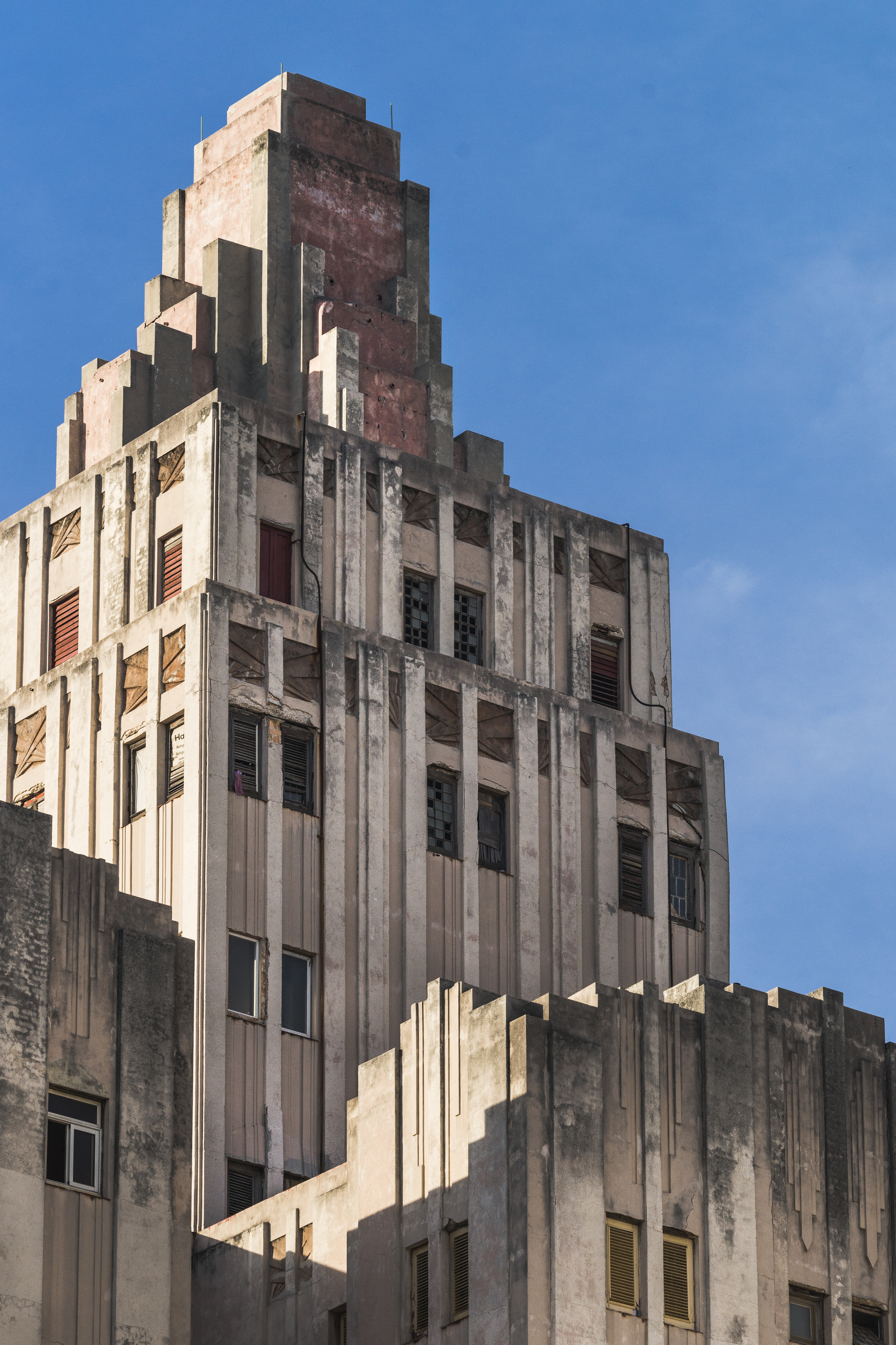

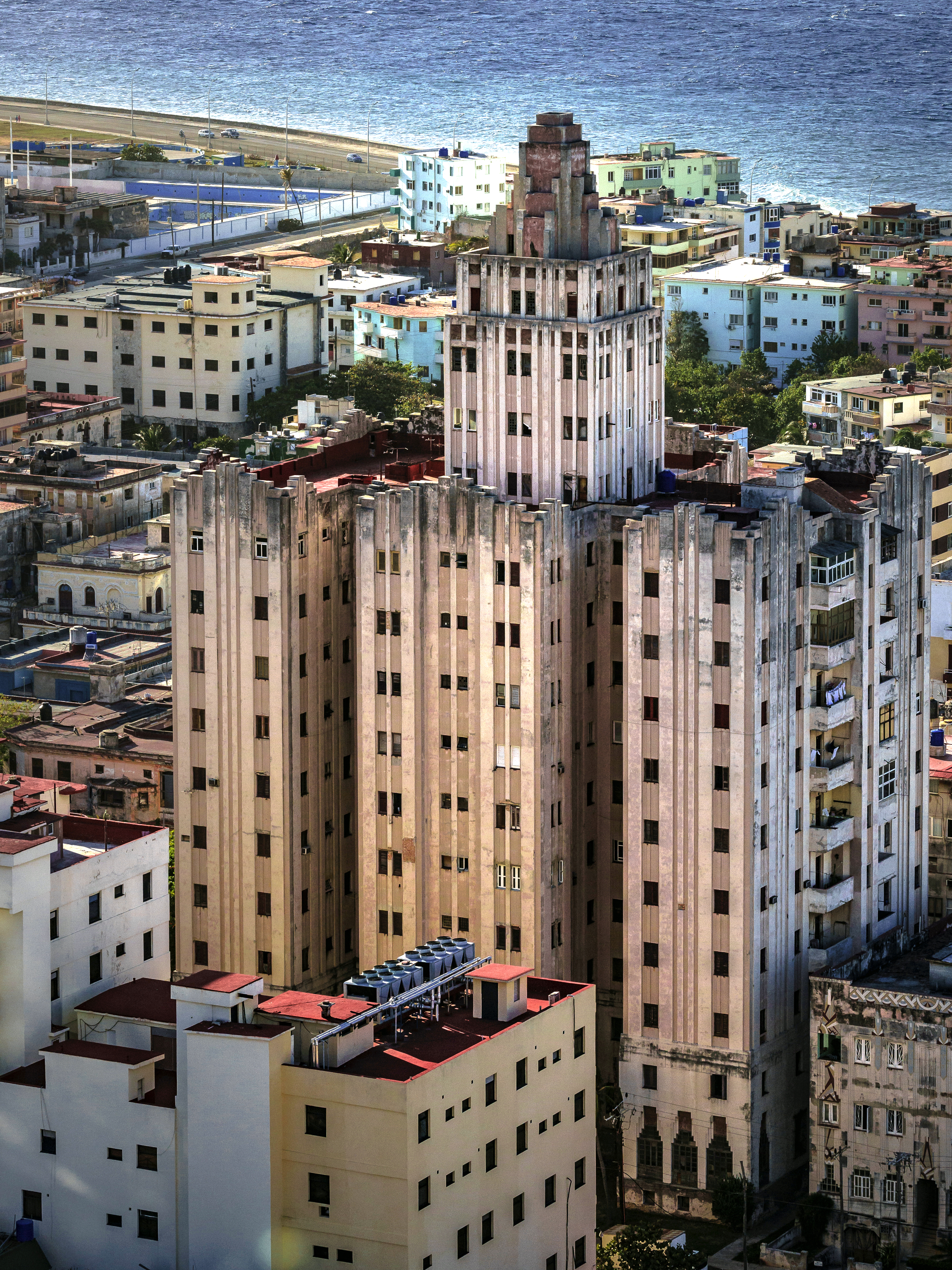

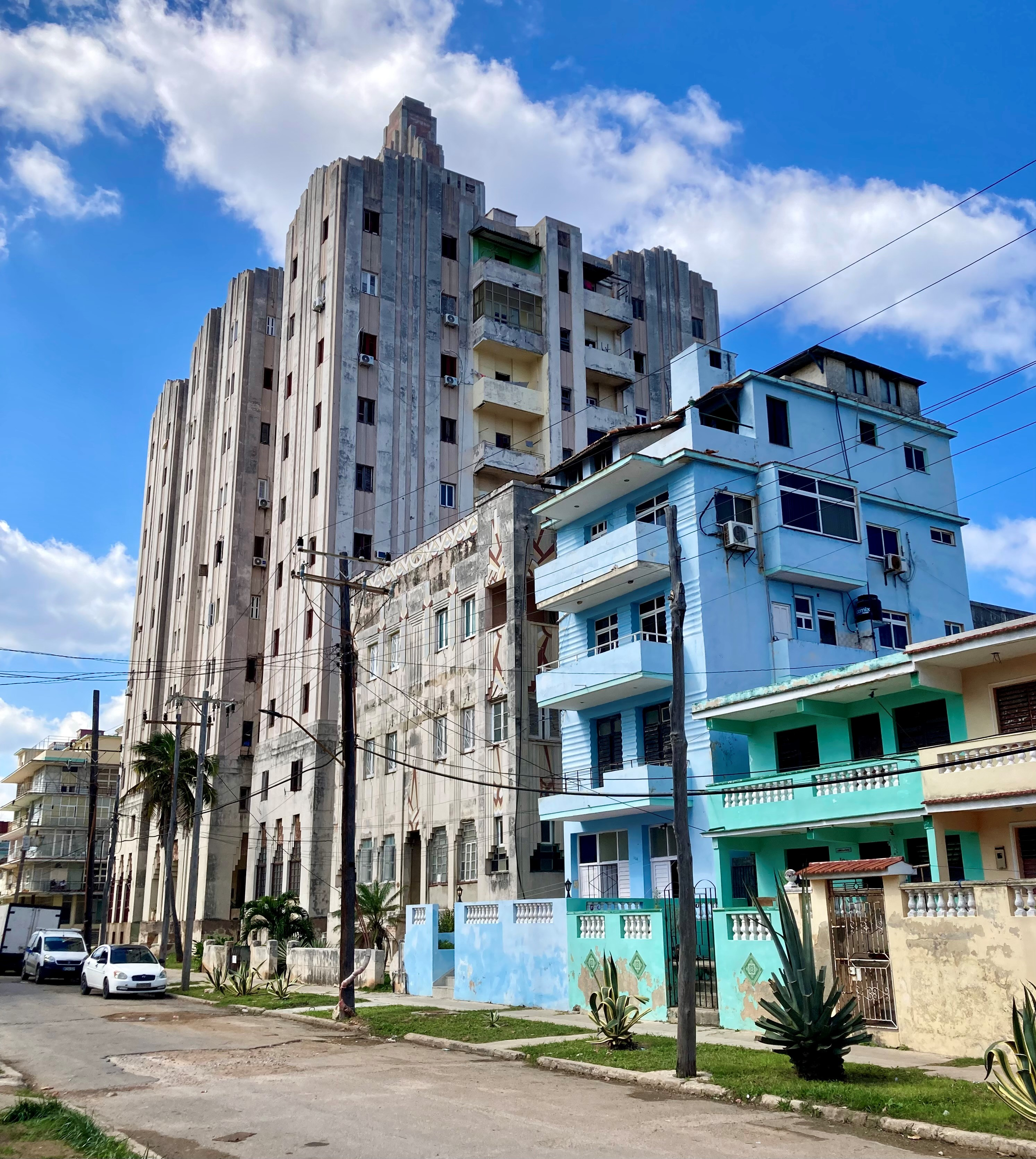
In 2024

== See also ==
- Bacardi Building (Havana)
- FOCSA Building
- Eduardo Chibás
- José Miguel Gómez
- Edificio del Seguro Médico, Havana
