= Bacardi Building (Havana) =

Landmark building in Havana, Cuba

Edificio Bacardí
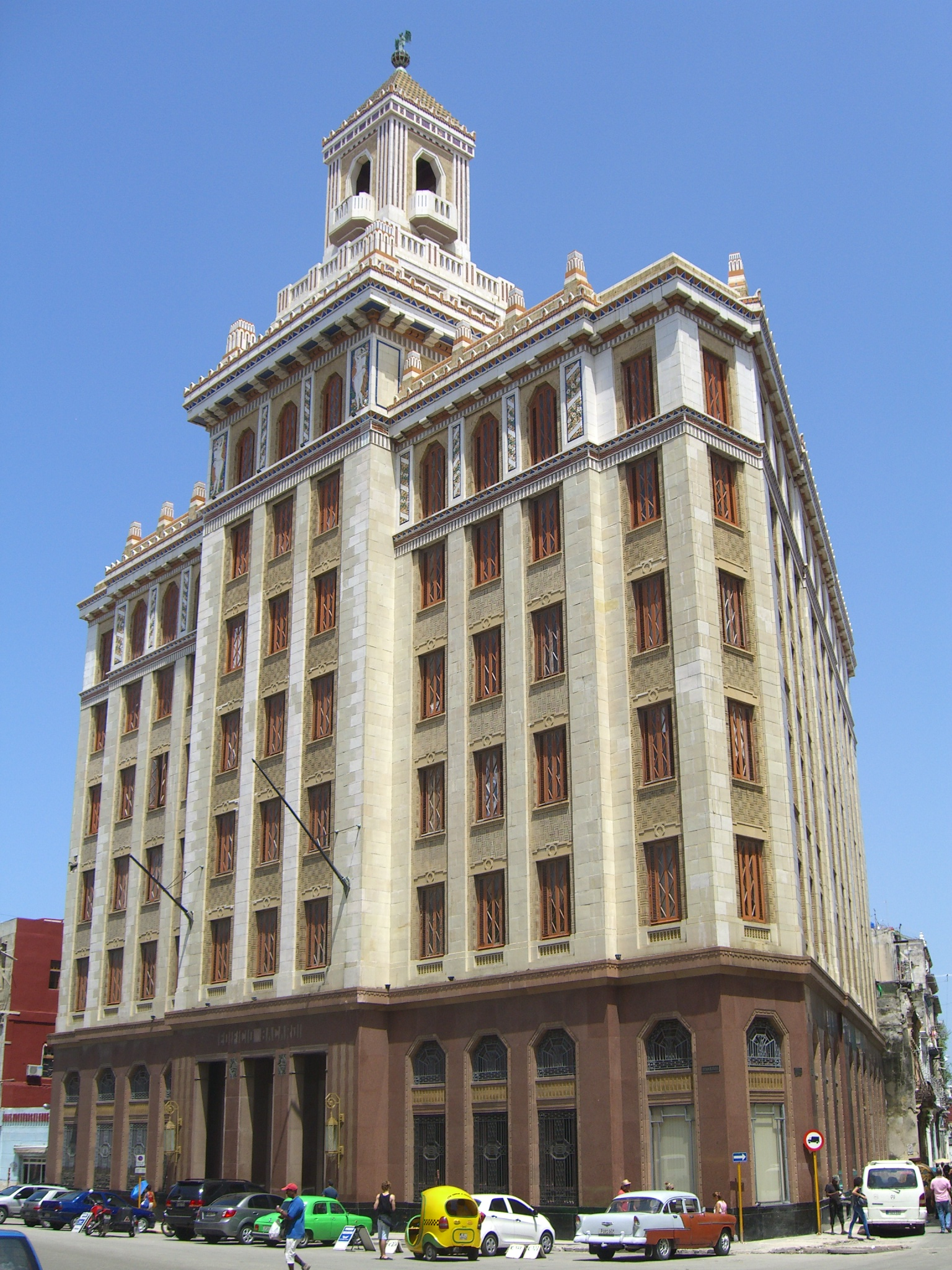
- Interactive map of the Edificio Bacardí area

General information
- Type: Office
- Architectural style: Art deco
- Location: Havana Vieja, Avenida de Bélgica No. 261, Ciudad de La Habana, Cuba
- Coordinates: 23.1389°N 82.3571°W
- Construction started: January 6, 1930
- Completed: December 1930
- Owner: Revolutionary government (contested) (Note: This theft of private property led the U.S. into severing diplomatic relations in 1961 and installing the trade embargo and various sanctions against Cuba. "Thousands of Americans and Cuban citizens suffered humiliation and financial distresses of having their private property stolen from them, some of them at gunpoint. Today there has been no justice for that their claims.")

Height
- Tip: 44 metres (144 ft)
- Antenna spire: 47 metres (154 ft) (top of bat logo)
- Roof: 28 metres (92 ft)
- Observatory: 36 metres (118 ft)

Technical details
- Structural system: Steel frame
- Material: Concrete, marble, brick, stone
- Size: 1,082.25 m^{2} (11,649.2 sq ft)per flr.
- Floor count: 8 full floors/4 tower
- Floor area: 9,000 m^{2} (97,000 sq ft)
- Lifts/elevators: 2
- Grounds: 1,320 m^{2} (14,200 sq ft)

Design and construction
- Architects: Esteban Rodríguez and Castells, Rafael Fernández Ruenes
- Structural engineer: José Menéndez Menéndez
- Main contractor: Grasyma of Wansiedel

Website
- bacardilimited.com

The Bacardi Building (Edificio Bacardí) is an Art Deco Havana landmark designed by the architects Esteban Rodríguez-Castells and Rafael Fernández Ruenes and completed in 1930. It is located on the corner of Calles Monserrate and San Juan de Dios on a 1,320 m^{2} (14,200 sq ft) lot in Las Murallas, Old Havana.

== History ==
The Bacardi Building was designed to be the headquarters for the Bacardi Rum Company; it was nationalized by the Castro government in the early 1960s. In 2001, the building was restored by an Italian construction firm. The interior retains the original decorations in marble and granite. It is regarded as one of the finest Art Deco buildings in Latin America.

== Architecture ==
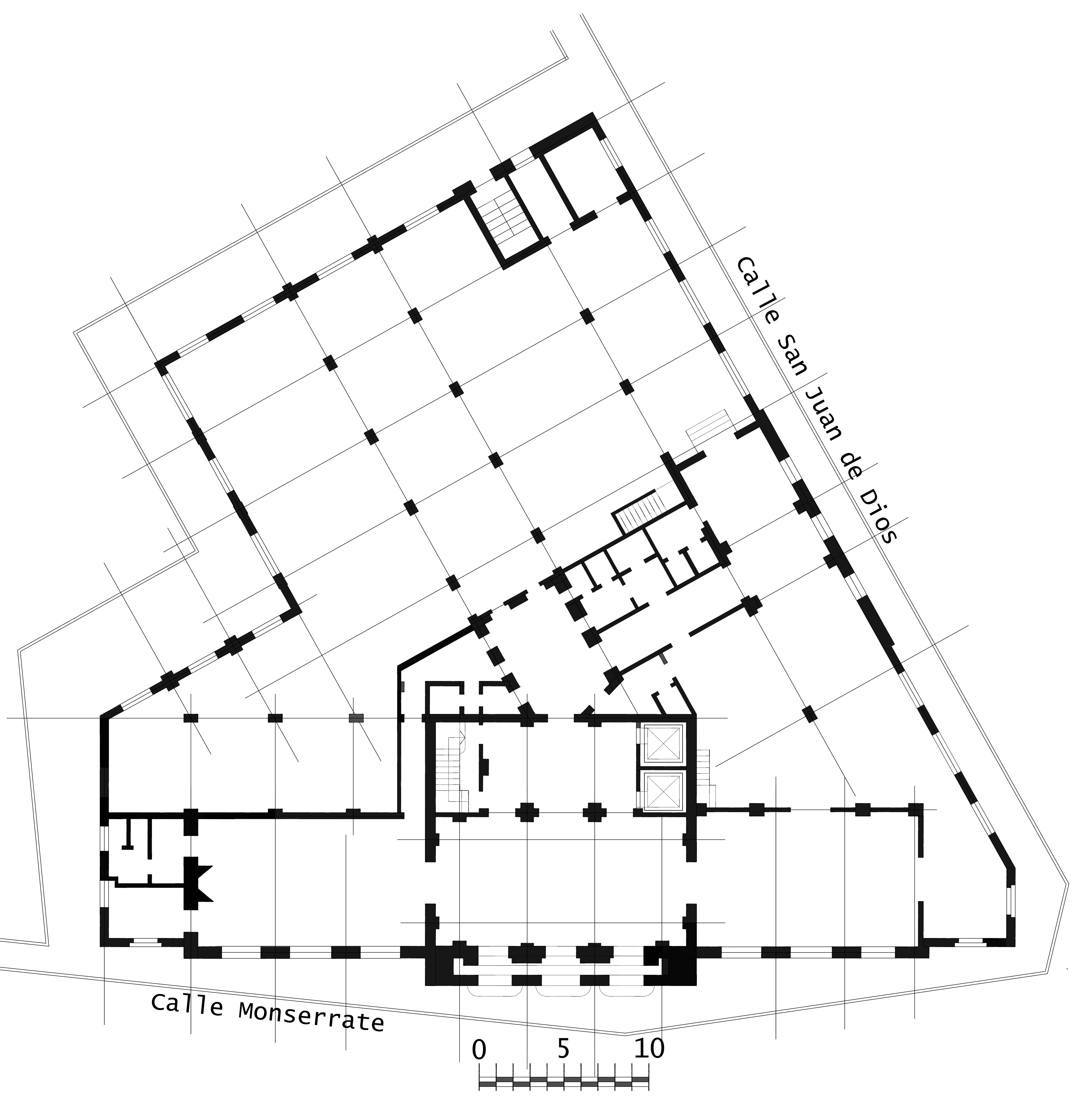
Bacardi Building, Ground Floor Plan

The building was the outcome of an architectural design competition. The owners of the Bacardi company invited a number of architects to present their design proposals for a new headquarters building offering 1,000 pesos to the winner. The competition was made up of a panel of judges that included Henri Schueg Chassin, president of Bacardi, and the architects Leonardo Morales y Pedroso, the architect for Colegio Belen, Enrique Gil, Emilio de Soto, and Pedro Martínez Inclán. The first prize was awarded to architects Esteban Rodríguez-Castells and Rafael Fernández Ruenes. José Menéndez Menéndez was the architect-engineer in the project.

Construction of the building started on January 6, 1930, and was completed by the 300-day deadline the company had set for December. Poor conditions of the land required that the foundation use piles of hardwood (jiqui and júcaro negro) and high strength concrete. At the peak of the building (47m) is a bronze sculpture of the company logo, a fruit bat. Its design gives the building a unique chromatic effect and a decorative element of Catalan modernism. At the brim of the building are inflected flat panel sculptures of sirens.

Bacardi Building, first floor

The first floor contained a bar with column archways where patrons of the restaurant in the mezzanine area could overlook the bar while they dined. It was open to the public and known to have many celebrities who frequented. Most of the marble and granite were imported from Europe: Germany, Sweden, Norway, Italy, France, Belgium and Hungary.

With an area of 1,075 sq. meters and 7.25 meters of support, the first floor walls, floor, and ceiling are adorned in pink granite from Bavaria, and the two halls are of green marble from floor to ceiling. The construction work was carried out by the company Grasyma of Wansiedel, Bavaria of Germany, which took great care in the fine details of the work and the time-sensitivity of the project deadline.

The property has a cistern with capacity for 8,700 US gallons (33,000 L; 7,200 imp gal) of water, which pumped into a tank inside the tower with capacity for 4,800 US gallons (18,000 L; 4,000 imp gal). In addition, it has four elevators for different uses: two are used for passengers with a capacity of 10 people each and a speed of 110 metres (360 ft) per minute; another is a cargo elevator for the transportation of furniture, with a capacity of 1,800 kilograms (4,000 lb); and the fourth one makes trips between the basement and the first floor to transport goods.

Construction was completed in December 1930 and at the time it was the tallest building in Havana.

== Gallery ==
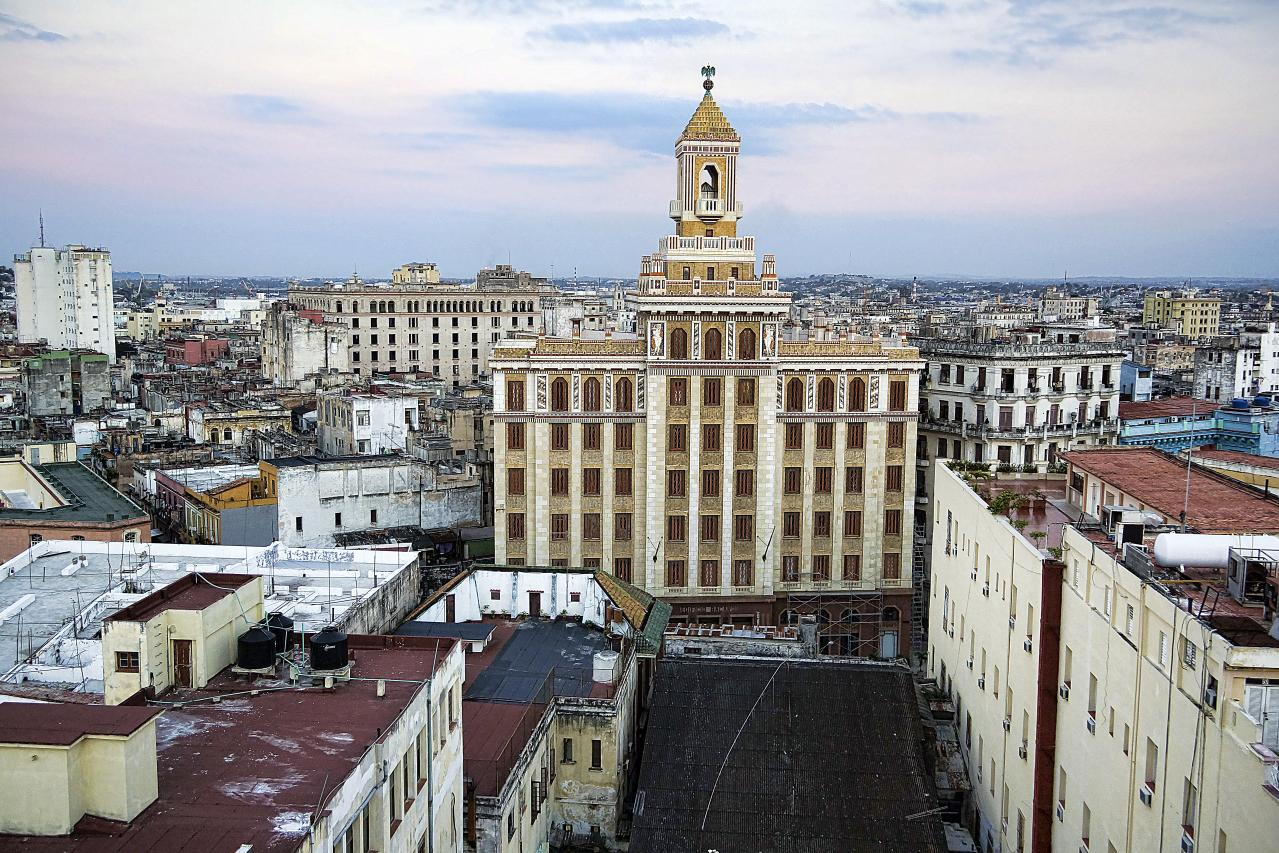

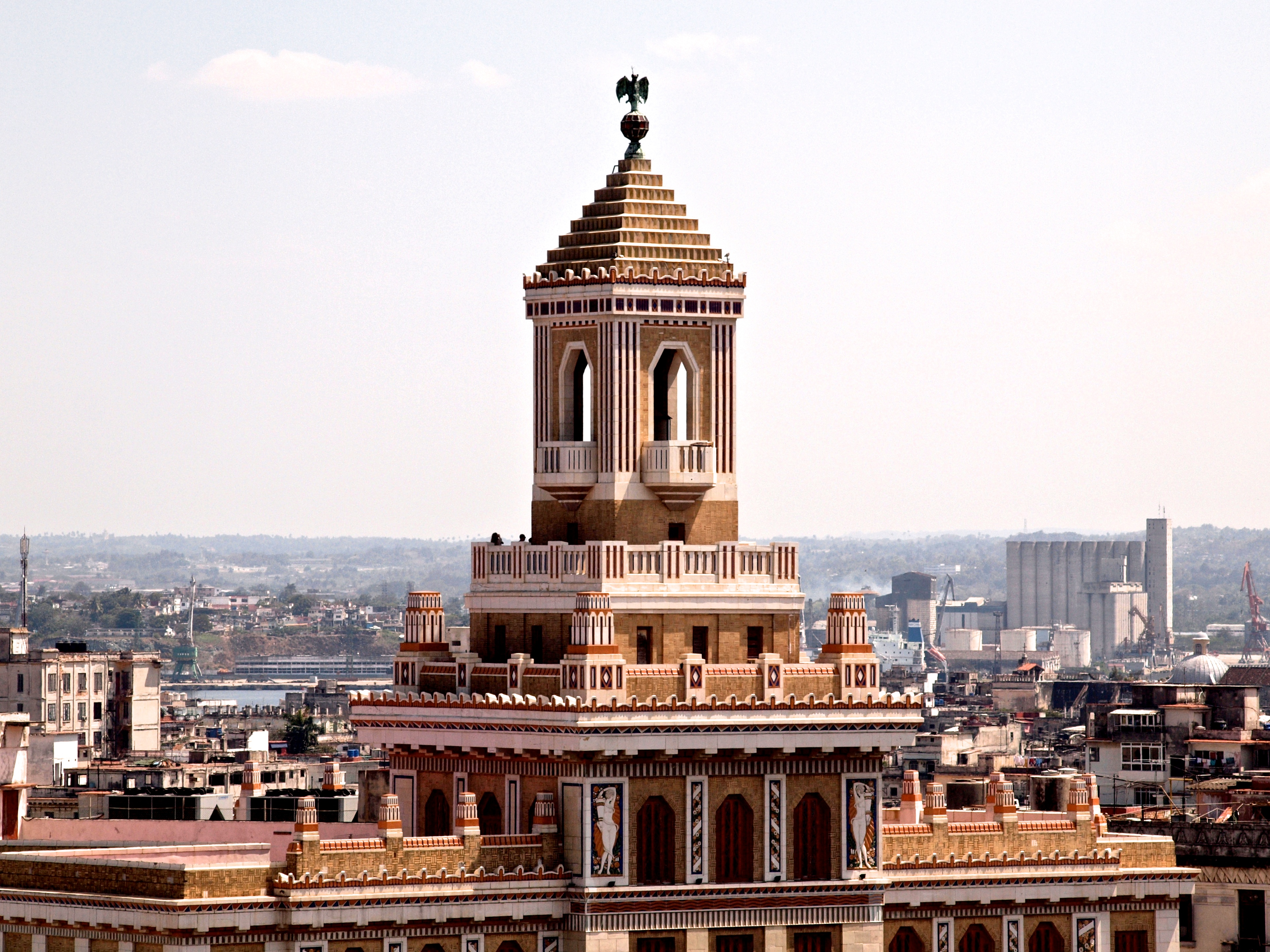

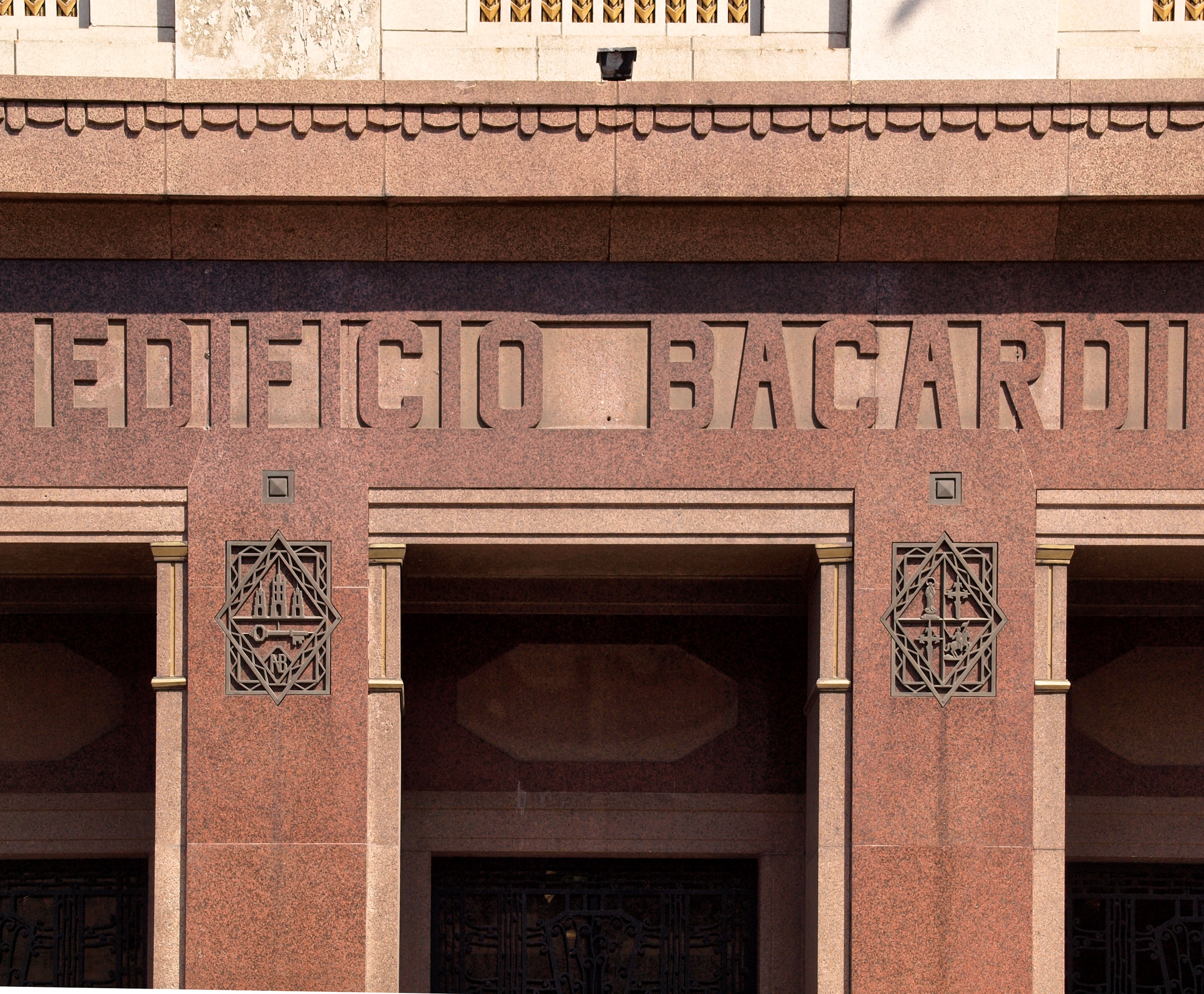

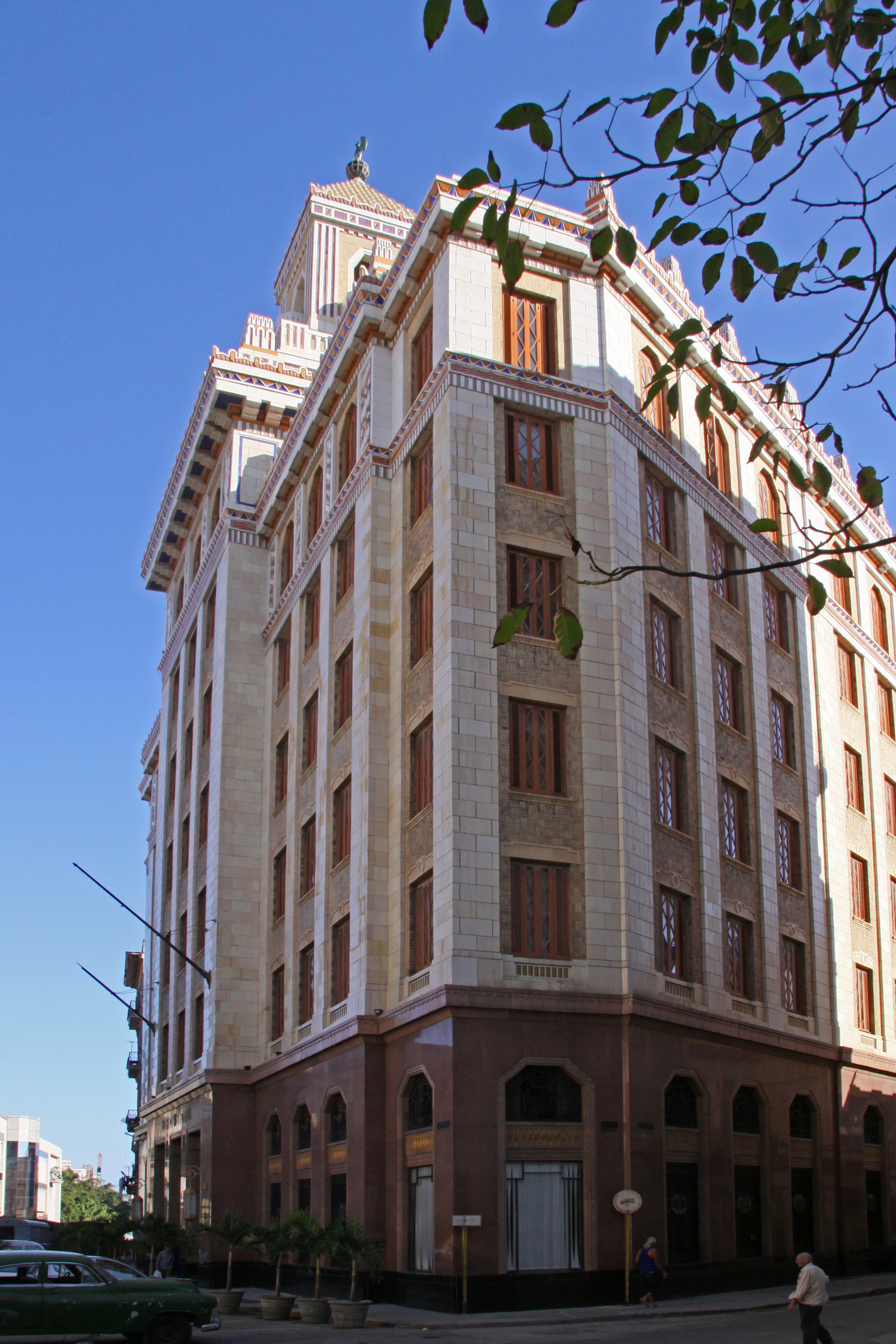

== See also ==
- List of buildings in Havana
- López Serrano Building
