= Edificio del Seguro Médico, Havana =

Commercial building in Havana, Cuba

Edificio del Seguro Médico
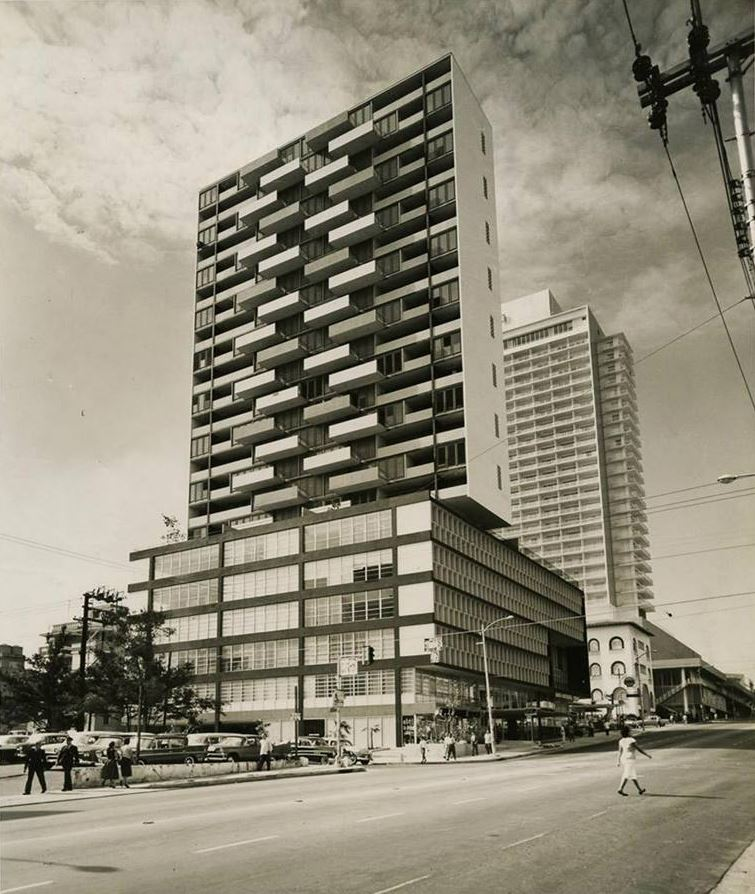
- Interactive map of the Edificio del Seguro Médico area

General information
- Status: Occupied
- Type: Mixed use
- Architectural style: Modern
- Location: El Vedado, Calle 23 #201 esquina a N, Vedado, Plaza de la Revolución, La Habana, Havana, Cuba
- Coordinates: 23.140440°N 82.381541°W
- Current tenants: Ministry of Public Health, The Prensa Latina
- Named for: Edificio del Seguro Médico
- Groundbreaking: 1955
- Estimated completion: 1958
- Owner: Revolutionary government (contested) (Note: This theft of private property led the U.S. into severing diplomatic relations in 1961 and installing the trade embargo and various sanctions against Cuba. "Thousands of Americans and Cuban citizens suffered humiliation and financial distresses of having their private property stolen from them, some of them at gunpoint. Today there has been no justice for that their claims.")

Height
- Height: 90 meters (300 ft)

Technical details
- Structural system: Column-wall and slab
- Material: Concrete, concrete block, wood, aluminum, glass
- Floor count: 23
- Floor area: 15,084 m^{2} (162,360 sq ft)
- Lifts/elevators: 3
- Grounds: 1,806 m^{2} (19,440 sq ft)+ 2,000 m2

Design and construction
- Architects: Antonio Quintana Simonetti, Augusto Pérez Beato, Juan Tosca Sotolongo, José Feito Mayo, and Rolando Samuel
- Architecture firm: Quintana, Rubio y Pérez Beato
- Awards: Premio Medalla de Oro del Colegio Nacional de Arquitectos. Premio anual, 1959
- Known for: One of the first mixed use buildings in Havana

Other information
- Number of rooms: 71 apts

The Edificio del Seguro Médico is a commercial building in El Vedado, Havana. Built between 1955 and 1958, it was designed as a mixed use building for apartments and offices for the headquarters of the National Medical Insurance Company by Antonio Quintana Simonetti.

In regards to Edificio del Seguro Médico an architect from the Universidad de Oriente, Santiago de Cuba, Carlos Alberto Odio Soto made the following observation:

"Within the modern heritage architecture of the 50s, there is the Medical Insurance Building, work designed by the architect Antonio Quintana in 1955. This work was praised even before its inauguration by the prestigious Professor Pedro Martínez Inclán on the occasion of the delivery of the First Prize to the Project where he proposed that Quintana, when he managed to carry out his project, could blazon of having endowed Havana, according to the famous sentence of Paul Valery, "of a building that speaks." At the national level, Quintana received the recognition of the main specialized publications that circulated in the country at that time: Architecture, Space, Cuba Album, etc .; at the same time is diffused internationally through the book Latin American Architecture since 1945, published by the Museum of Modern Art in New York, and the Exhibition of Modern Cuban Architecture held in the city itself by the Architectural League of New York. Almost at the end of the 50s, he receives two distinctions: in 1959 the Gold Medal Award of the National College of Architects and the condition of best commercial work of this period."

Today the building houses the Cuban Ministry of Public Health and the Prensa Latina Agency. The only complete package of information about the building is the slides that were presented for the architectural contest, collected in the magazine 'Arquitectura', nº 269, of 1955 published by the College of Architects of Havana.

== History ==
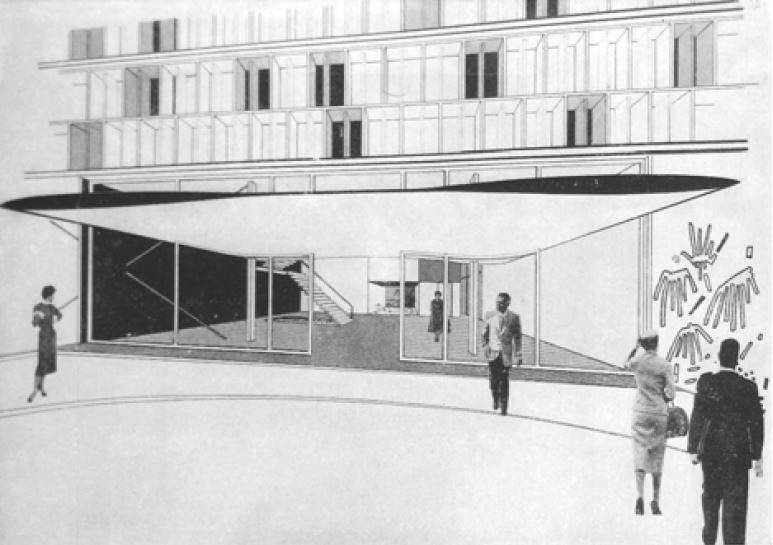
Commercial building entrance on La Rampa. Drawing by Quintana.

The project arose as a result of 1955 architectural competition for the new headquarters of the Cuban Colegio de Médicos (National Medical Association) and offices of the Medical Insurance Company. Because of the high cost of the site, the project was increased by the need to add rental income from apartments that would help to make the building profitable. Antonio Quintana's proposal was the winner since it managed to solve the complexity of the program with two volumes: a five-story box containing the administrative offices, an auditorium, lobbies, and an eighteen-story modernist slab with a separate lobby. Quintana established a visual dialogue between the two geometries and generated new guidelines for the new emerging modernist, mixed-use typologies in Havana. (Note: "The first high-rise building, the Edificio del Retiro Odontólogico(1951–1953, Dental Building) resulted from an open competition, whose first prize was awarded to the team of architects Antonio Quintana Simonetti, Beale, Rubio, and Pérez Beato. To articulate the complex program that included the new headquarters of the College of Dentists, an underground garage, shops, and a 200-person assembly hall, the architects opted to deconstruct the overall project into a series of elements that would express their function, from the most public to the most private. As completed, the building consists of a U-shaped, fifteen-story-high structure made up of two towers of offices articulated by a circulation core facing the courtyard. On their southern and western sides, the office floors are covered with a grid of horizontal brise-soleils, whereas the façades around the courtyard are fully glazed and the circulation core appears as a blind wall. The front façade is the most iconic and reflects the interaction of the public with the street. Above the shops and the garage entrance, the second floor, used for a cafeteria, offices, and the auditorium, expresses itself on the street in continuous rows of closely spaced concrete louvers whose size contrasts with the grid covering the towers. On the third floor, the roof of the auditorium functions as an outdoor patio which connects to the front façade and mutates into a public terrace overlooking the activity of the street below.")

The Seguro Medico was a private company, they were the landlord and owner of the residential tower and thus subject to the new property redistribution instituted by the Castro government. Early in the new revolutionary government, guided by the principles that: 1. housing is a right, not a commodity, 2. housing should be equitable, and 3. the government is the primary decision-maker, "Fidel Castro sought to release the grip landlords held on Cuban properties with a 1960 urban-reform law that eliminated multiple ownership, gave renters a chance to buy their homes at low cost and made the state responsible for providing housing." Thus, all private property was abolished and the government forcefully became the new owner of the Seguro Medico building.

== Program ==
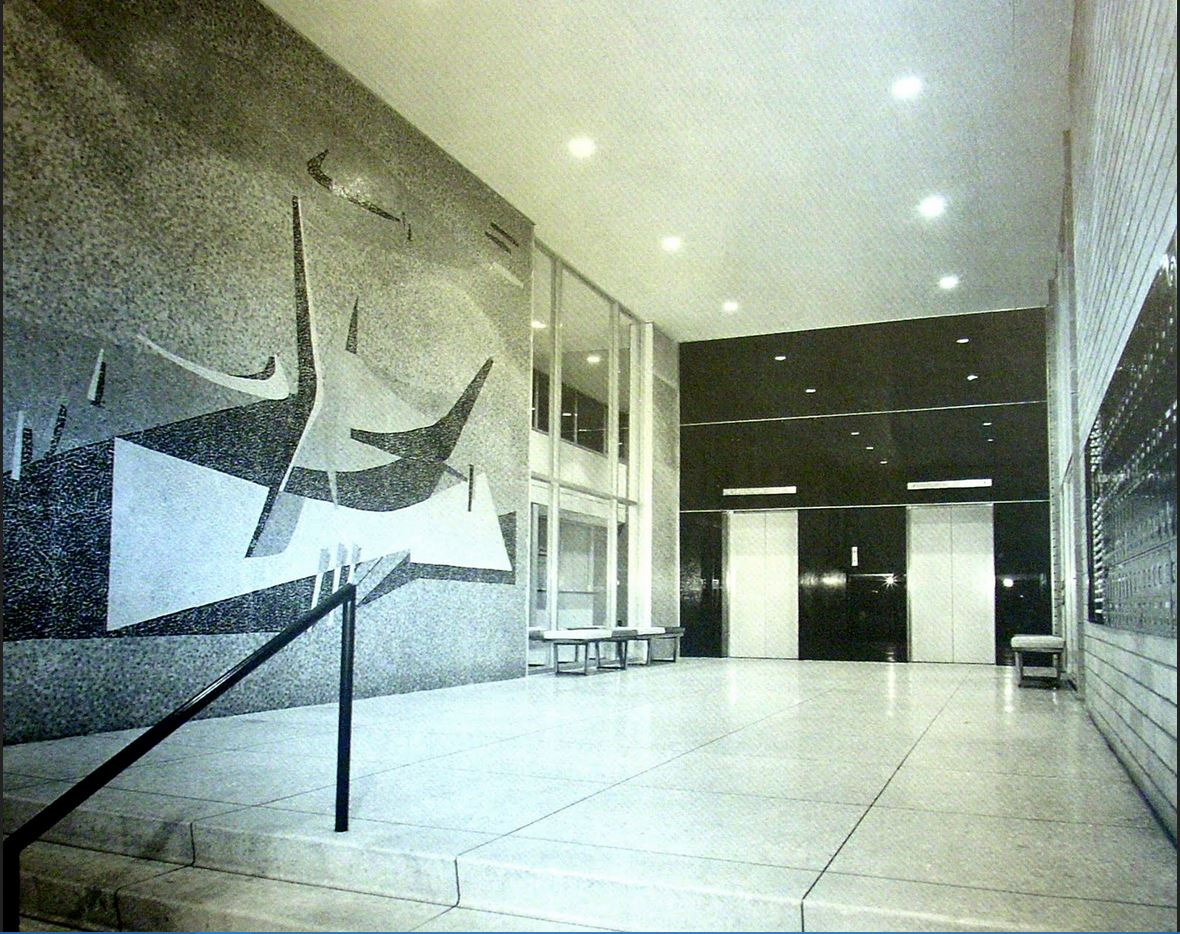
Residential lobby entrance from Calle N, mural by Mariano Rodriguez

The first mixed-use building in Havana was the Radiocentro CMQ Building, also on La Rampa (Calle 23). The modernist Edificio del Seguro Médico is one of the earliest mixed-use buildings (commercial/residential) in Havana. Similar to the Lever House in Manhattan, Antonio Quintana Simonetti (1919–1943) sets up a relationship of two volumes of dissimilar proportion: a box at the lower level containing the Seguro Médico offices, and an eighteen-story residential block. Similar to the FOCSA Building's podium used only for recreation, the residences are located over the roof of the Seguro Medico offices; a large plane made into a children's playground (garden) as shown in the Quintana sketch-drawing for that area.

Because the building must accommodate a dual program, there is a total separation by way of two scales, two structural modules, and two entrances on two different streets. (Note: Mariano Rodriguez won, together with Wifredo Lam, the competition for the realization of two murals. Mariano's mural is in ceramic and titled Boomerang. His work Gallo Amarillo obtained a merit award of $500.00 at the VIII National Painting and Sculpture Hall and went to the collection of the National Museum.)

== Architecture ==
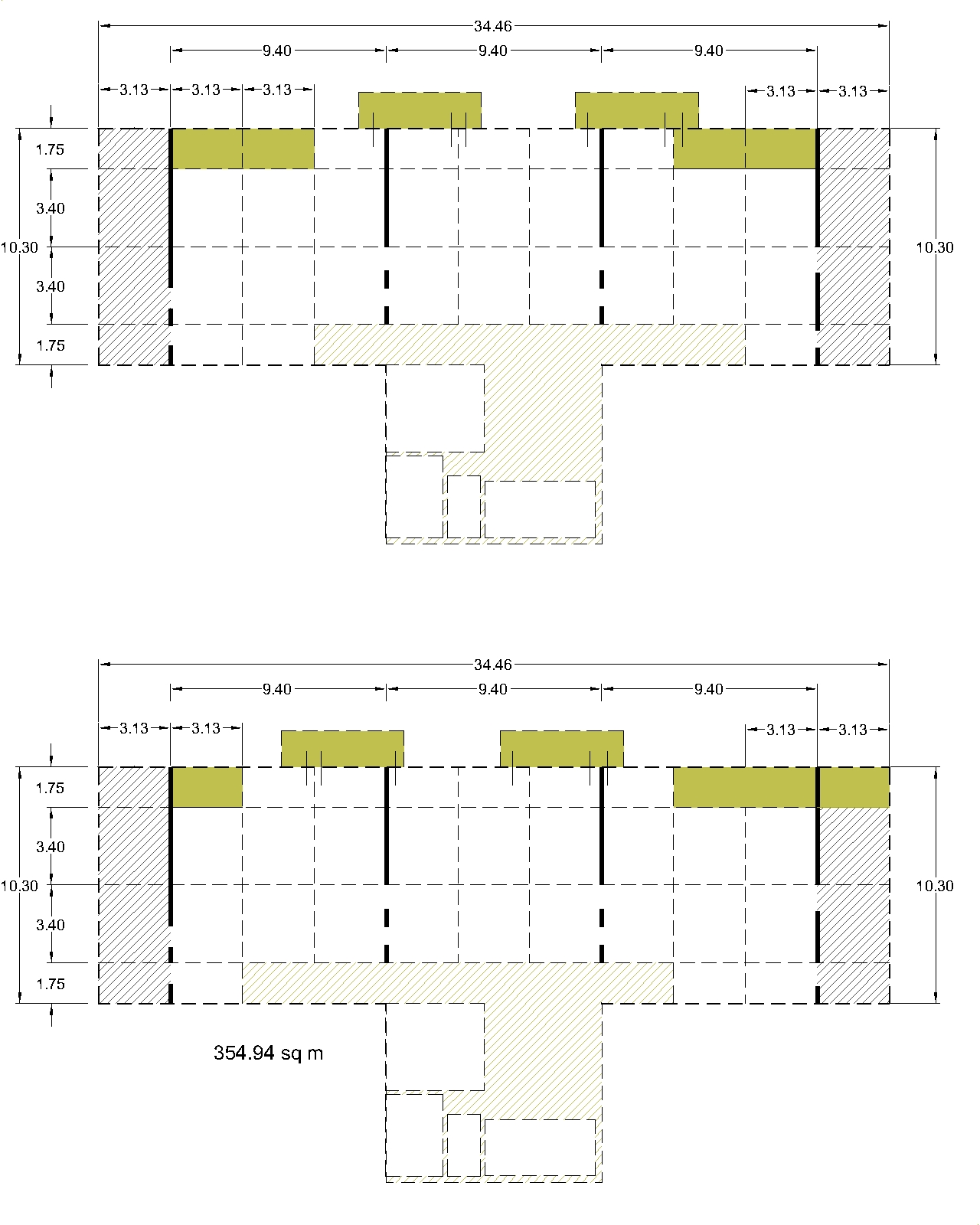
Structural Plan. Residential block

=== Residential module ===
The residential block has an architectural module of 3.13 metres (10.3 ft) by 3.40 metres (11.2 ft). Three 3.13 metres (10.3 ft) modules are expressed on the north elevation of the office block by the 9.40-meter dimension of the bearing walls. The outboard balconies are each of a different color and alternate position on every floor. The lower volume occupied today by the Ministry of Public Health. (Note: Robert Venturi in the ISI Building at 3501 Market Street near the Penn campus designed a flush facade (on the north-east side of the building) similar to the Edificio del Seguro Médico so that there is a modernist reading, no shadows from the window frames register on the facade.) The 3.40 metres (11.2 ft) width of the rooms is further subdivided into three sections of 1.13 metres (3 ft 8 in) and this module determines the width of doors, windows, and passages between rooms within the apartment. The wooden windows have two sets of nine movable slats that can be independently controlled to modulate the natural light in the room, they can be completely closed to make the room totally dark, even in bright days. The pattern of the windows and door and the bearing walls (9.40 meters apart) are expressed on the Calle N elevation.

=== Balconies, walls and floors ===
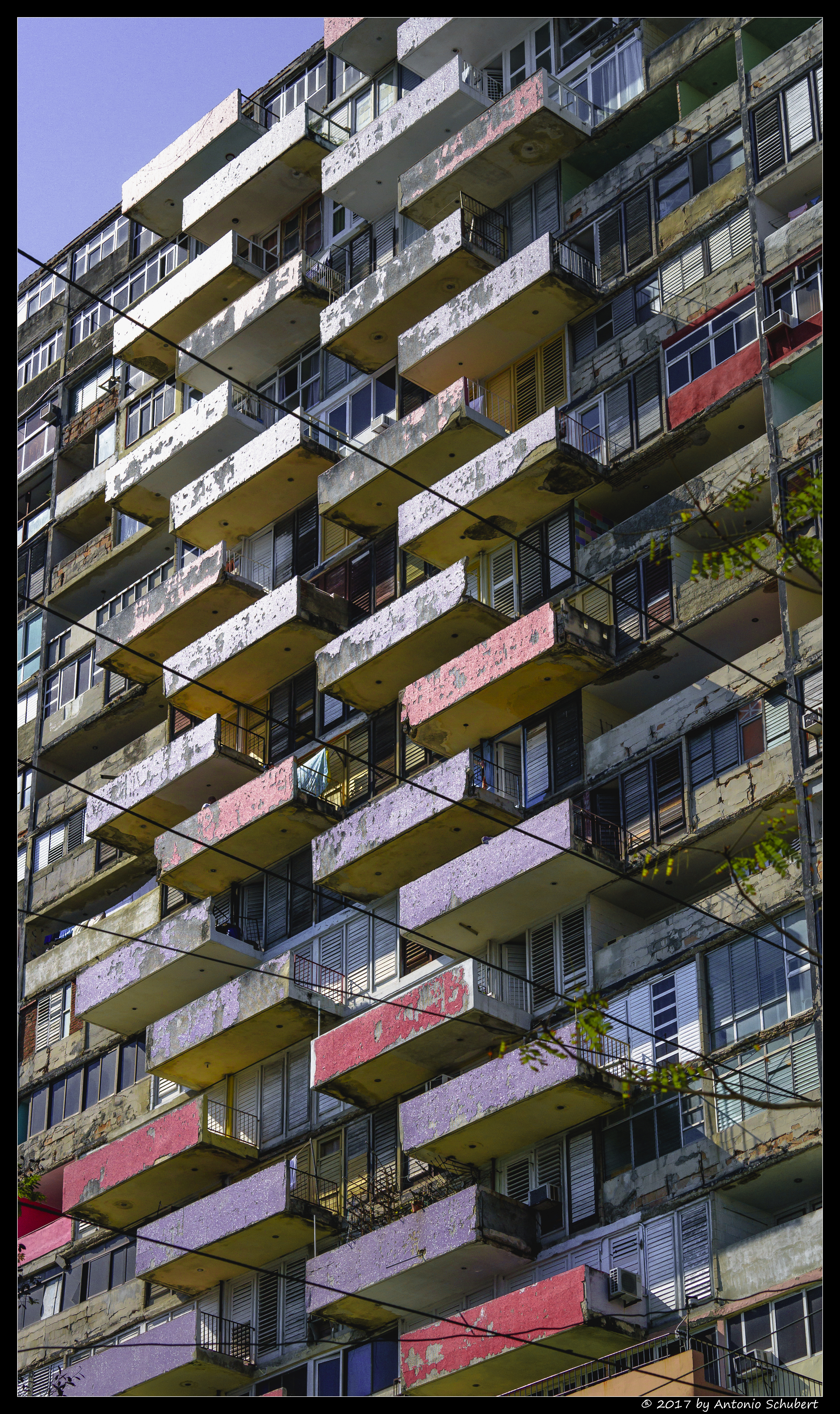
Balconies in their present state of disrepair.

The balconies have a 15.24 cm terrazzo baseboard and two incandescent lights located in the ceiling of the balcony above. The front railing of the outboard balconies are the upturned concrete floor slab, the two pre-fab side railings are metal. Originally the floors in the residential tower were of black terrazzo.

There are four structural walls of poured in place reinforced concrete. The two center walls are the shear panels of the tower. The height of the apartment ceiling is eleven concrete blocks high plus a terrazzo base (2,352 millimetres (92.6 in)). They divide the apartments and rooms and are unpainted, set in common, gray mortar, the wall sits on top of a black 152 millimetres (6.0 in) terrazzo baseboard that matches the floors. Several of the doors in the apartment as the bathroom doors, for instance, have fixed louvers between the space from the top of the door to the ceiling, some of the doors have a 320 millimetres (13 in) fixed panel of glass over them. In some of the bathrooms, the terrazzo floor is raised by a step.

In both sides of the rear elevation on each floor, there is a 12.65-meter long wall that is subdivided down the center it is divided horizontally into three parts: 1-Two prefab concrete panels of 6.32 m or 9.48 m in length depending on the layout of the floor. 2- Located under the kitchen cabinets, a strip window of equal length and in the middle of the two concrete panels. The window has wooden "persianas" (venetian blinds) that were widely used in modern and traditional residential buildings in Havana such as the FOCSA Building and the López Serrano Building. The other wall is the exterior wall of the public corridor, made of floor to ceiling concrete blocks and set in such a way that allows for 2.43 m × 2.43 m openings throughout so that the exterior wall of the semi-public corridor is partially open to the elements. The concrete block wall is either 6.32 or 3.17 meters long and alternates with the plank wall in an abstract pattern.

The wall enclosing the vestibule in front of the elevators is made of an aluminum frame for glass panel inserts with operable windows.

=== Ventilation and light ===
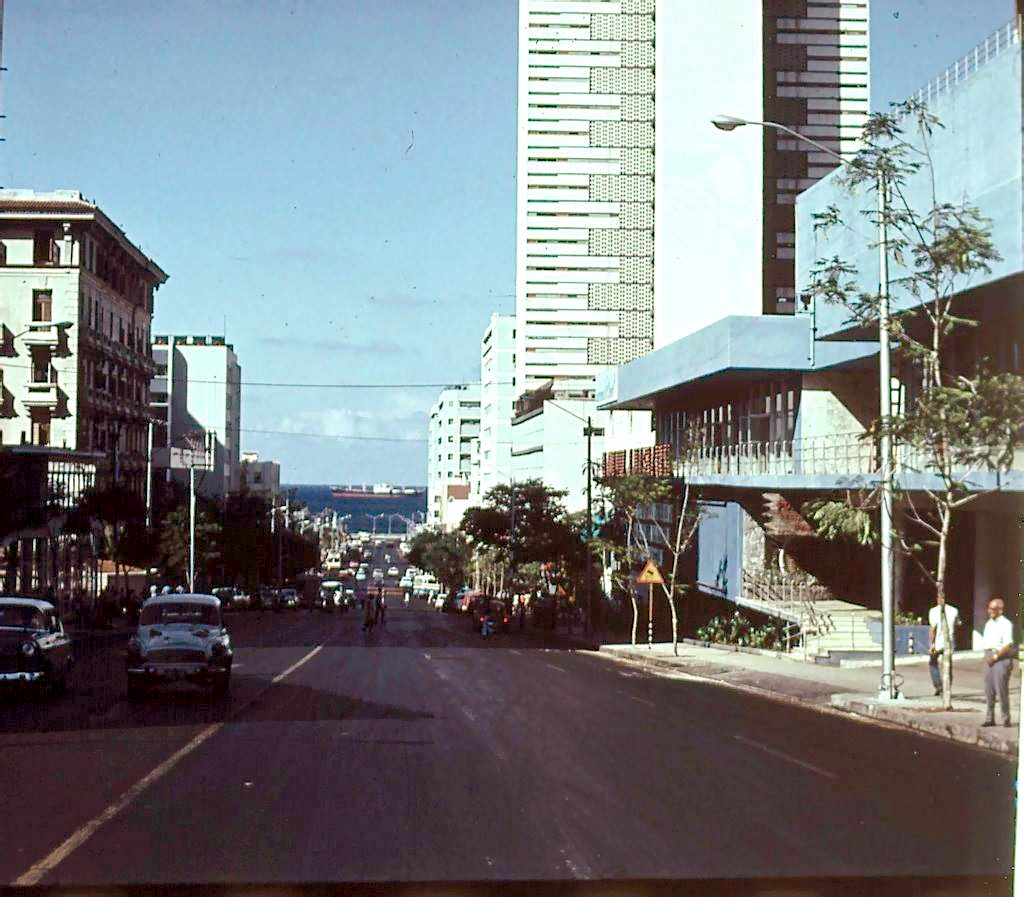
Edificio del Seguro Médico. South wall, rear elevation from La Rampa

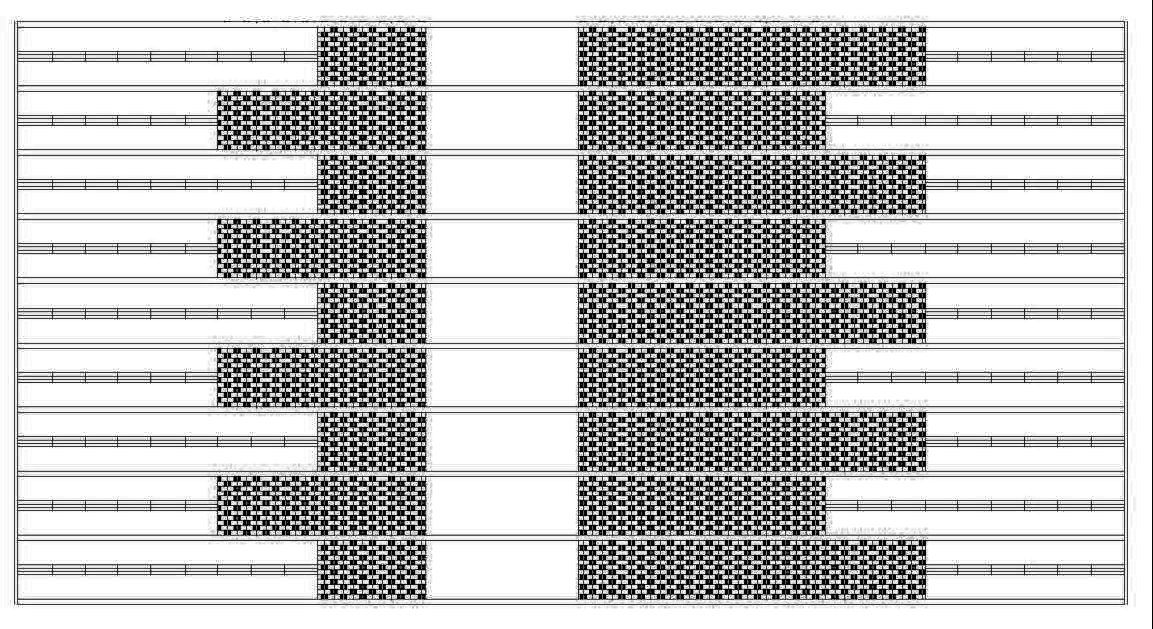
Edificio del Seguro Médico_wall detail, Havana

The north wall is designed to regulate the view, breezes from the north and the natural light. The entire wall is subdivided according to the 3.13 metres (10.3 ft) module and it is composed of louvered doors and windows that can be made to open completely so that the wall is de-materialized, or, its opposite, be made to change its character to the point where no air or light can enter the rooms. On the rear elevation, two different wall surface designs form an abstract pattern. One, accommodates a horizontal operable window in the middle of the wall, (similar to the FOCSA Building), which is made up of two prefab concrete slabs. The other design makes the wall partially porous by the placement of the cmu to allow for views, natural light and ventilation.

=== Murals ===
The building has two murals, one a black and white tesserae mural by Wifredo Lam entitled Abstracción which is located on the main entrance-commercial vestibule on Calle La Rampa; the other is in the residential lobby on Calle N and titled Boomerang, by Mariano Rodriguez.

=== Prize ===
The Edificio del Seguro Médico was awarded First Prize at the Architecture Competition in 1954 and a Gold Medal by the School of Architects in Havana in 1959.

== Structure ==
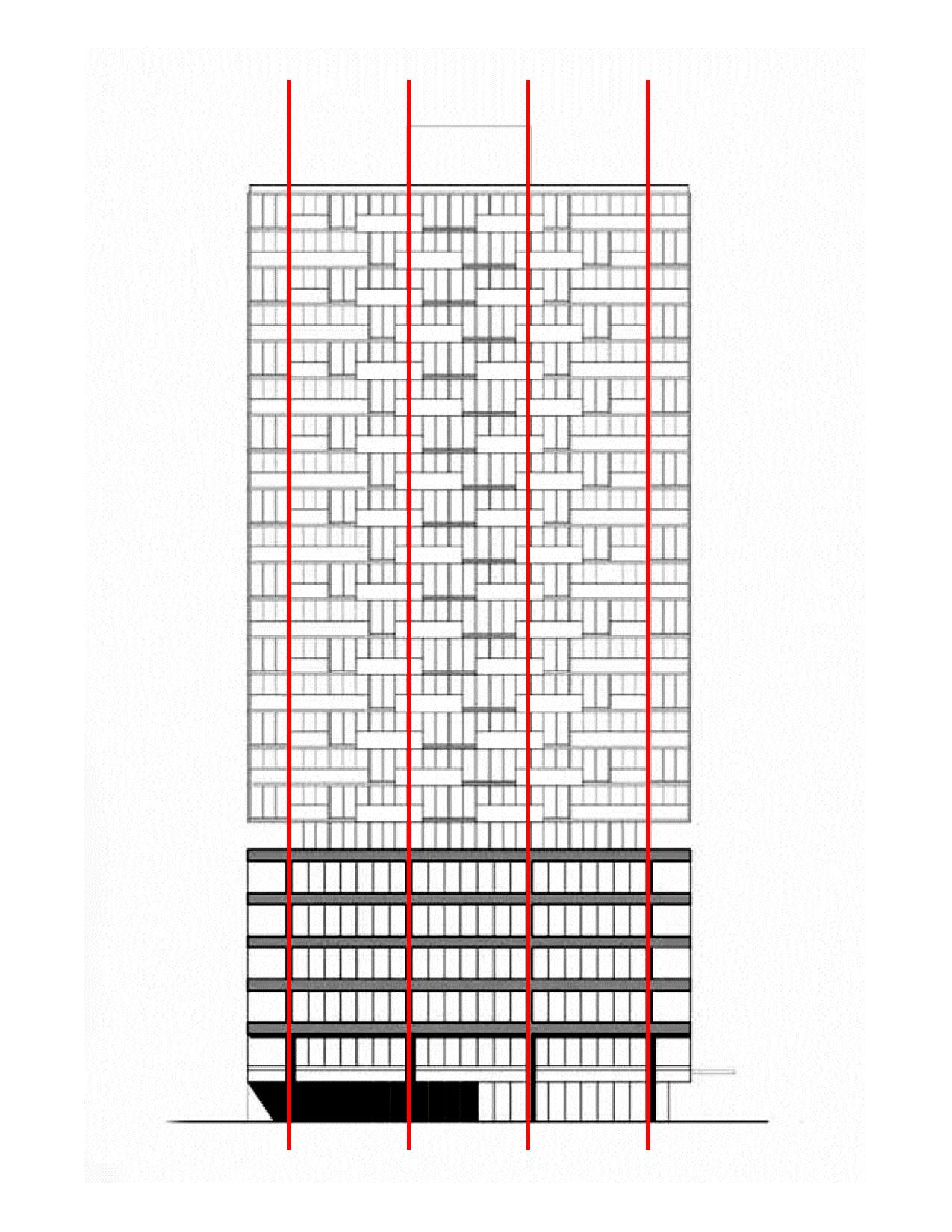
NE Elevation with the expression of the 9.40 meter residential module-structural support walls shown in red.

The residential block is supported by four bearing walls 9.40 meters apart, expressed on the office block by vertical glass mullions (4 red lines). These bearing walls allow for curtain wall construction: a non-loadbearing facade. The structural module of 9.40 meters by 10.30 meters. The 9.40-meter dimension between walls is further subdivided into three modules of 3.13 meters ( 10'-3"), and this is the architectural dimension seen previously of all the bedrooms and living rooms. There are eleven 3.15 meter subdivisions in total which make up the one-bedroom (6.30 meters) and two bedrooms (9.40 meters) apartments. The outermost 3.13 meters of slab at either end and on each floor, shown hatched on the structural plan diagram, is cantilevered and that is how Quintana achieves the thin walls at the ends of the apartment block (on the NE elevation), these walls only carry their own weight similar to the South and North walls of the United Nations Secretariat Building. They are the same thickness as the floor slabs. All outboard balconies are 5.34 meters long, all non-service rooms have access to balconies. The two basic floor plans of apartments alternate between the eighth floor and the twenty-third floor. The apartments on the seventh floor (the 1,449 sq m roof of the office block) had private gardens; the end wall of the residential block is missing and the residential block appears to float. (N.E. elevation). Unfortunately, the tenants of this apartment have added rooms so this subtle modernist detail has been lost. These three units and their private gardens, overlooking Calle 23, were confiscated early in 1960 and the roof was turned into a children's playground; the playground was eventually closed.

=== Office module ===
The 34.50 × 42 meters open structure floor plan (1,449 sq m) of the offices below the residential block (ground, second-floor plans) has a module of columns that is 9.4 m × 8.4 m on center and accommodates stairs of various dimensions, elevators, ramps, toilets, and an auditorium. It has a modernist reading as these appear as 'objects in space'. The 9.40-meter distance of the bearing walls of the residential slab above is positioned over the office block in such a way that the two innermost structural walls are carried down to the foundation of the building while the two outermost walls are supported by two columns each (below the sixth floor) as can be seen on the ground-floor and second-floor plans.

=== Parti pris ===
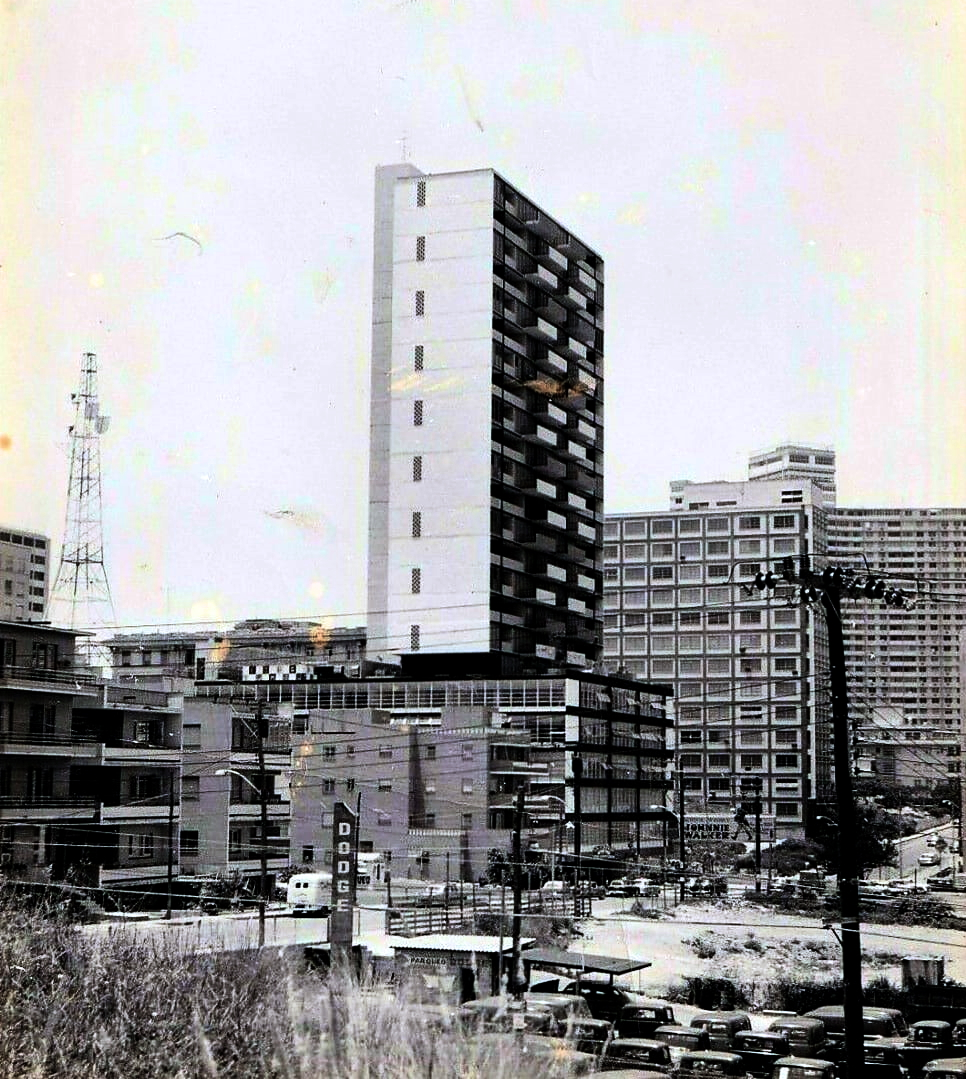
Edificio del Seguro Médico

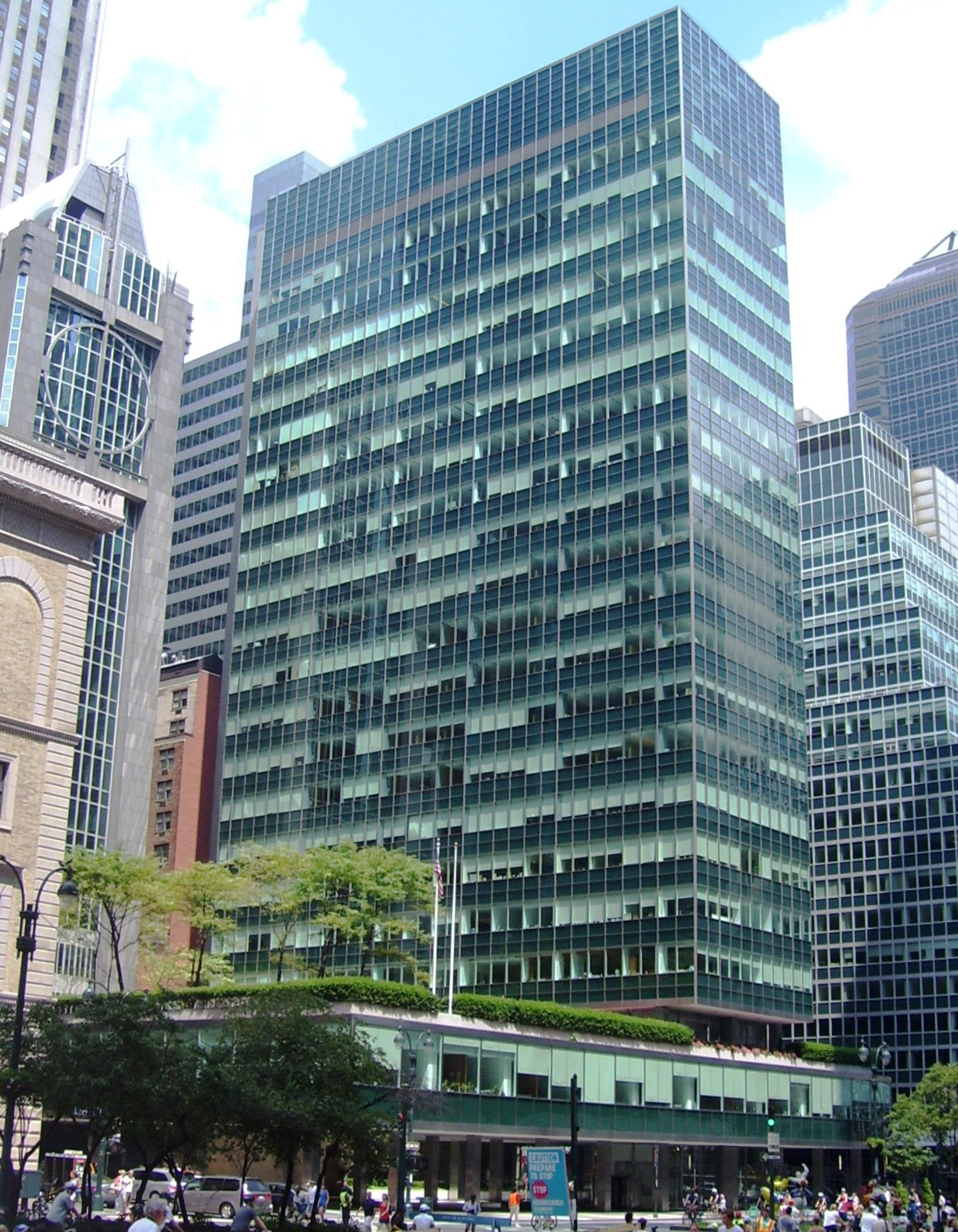
Lever House at 390 Park Avenue between East 53rd and 54th Streets in Midtown Manhattan, New York City, was built in 1950-52 and was designed by Gordon Bunshaft of Skidmore, Owings & Merrill in the International style. In 2003, the curtain wall was replaced, designed by SM&O. It has 21 floors and is 94 meters tall. (Sources: AIA Guide to NYC (5th ed.)

The parti (Note: "A primary protagonist was Rudolf Wittkower, who had published important essays on role of geometry in the works of Alberti and Palladio, essays later collected in Architectural Principles in the Age of Humanism (1949, 1962). The book includes Palladio's Geometry: the Villas, in which Wittkower argues that similar organizational schema underlie all the villas of Palladio. Wittkower's diagrams of the villas are variations of a three-bay by three-bay diagram; a nine-square grid. Wittkower suggests that Palladio's villas can be considered as a single conceptual project based on variations of an ideal plan diagram: "What was in Palladio's mind when he experimented over and over again with the same elements? Once he had found the basic geometric pattern for the problem 'villa,' he adapted it as clearly and as simply as possible to the special requirements of each commission. He reconciled the truth at hand with the 'certain truth' of mathematics which is final and unchangeable.") (Note: A Parti pris is an organizing thought or decision behind an architect's design, presented in the form of a basic diagram or a simple statement. It may be shortened to "parti". The term comes from 15th century French, in which "parti pris" meant "decision taken." Later, it took on the meaning of "bias" or "prejudice".) of the site's area distribution of the Edificio del Seguro Médico is similar to that of the FOCSA Building and the 1952 Lever House on Manhattan's Park Avenue. A concrete slab acts as a podium which in the three cases is the connection to the street. The function of the podium, in the FOCSA building and the Edificio del Seguro Médico, are of a different use (commercial vs residential), in the Lever House, the ground floor contains commercial tenants as the rest of the building. In the Lever House, there is an open plaza and a garden with pedestrian walkways. Only a small portion of the ground floor is enclosed. The second and largest floor contained the employees' lounge, medical suite, and general office facilities. The third floor contains the employees' cafeteria and terrace. The offices of Lever Brothers and its subsidiaries occupied the remaining floors with the executive penthouse on the 21st floor. The top three stories contained most of the property's mechanical space. The site distribution and parti is also similar to the proposed project that was to replace the Plaza del Vapor, designed in 1959 by the architect Carlos Alfonso for the National Institute of Savings and Housing under Pastorita Núñez. This project however was never built.

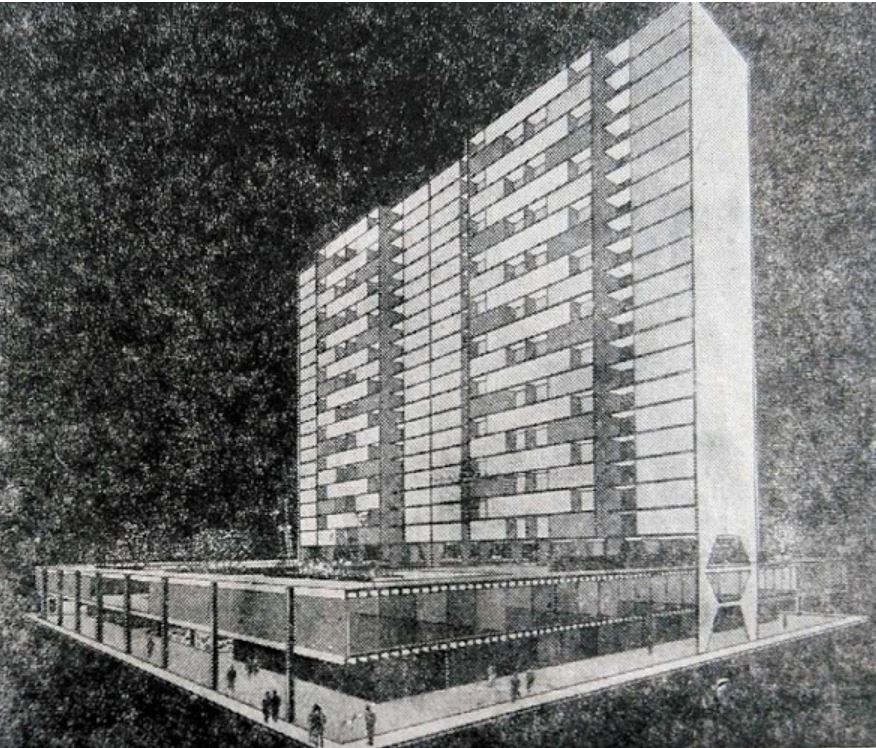
The proposed project to replace the Plaza del Vapor in 1959 by the architect Carlos Alfonso for the National Institute of Savings and Housing under Pastorita Núñez was similar in area distribution and in its parti to the FOCSA Building and Lever House in New York City.

== Gallery ==
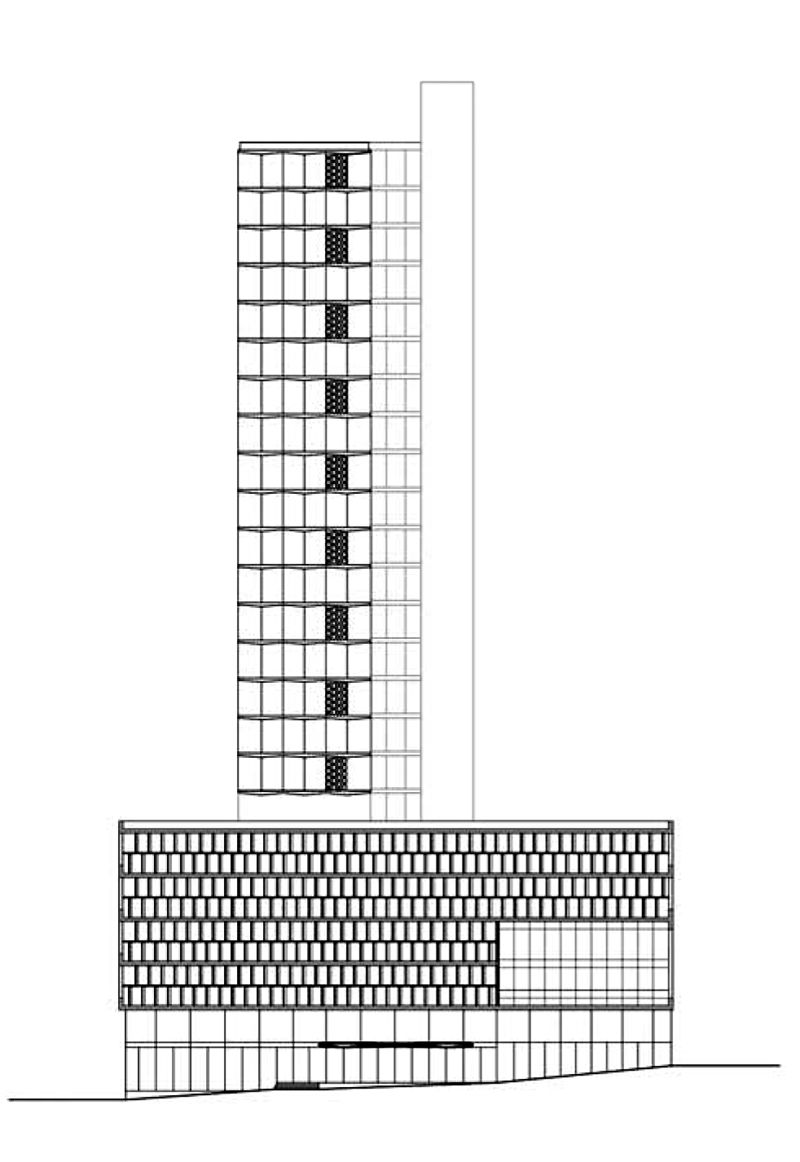
Edificio del Seguro Médico, La Rampa elevation.

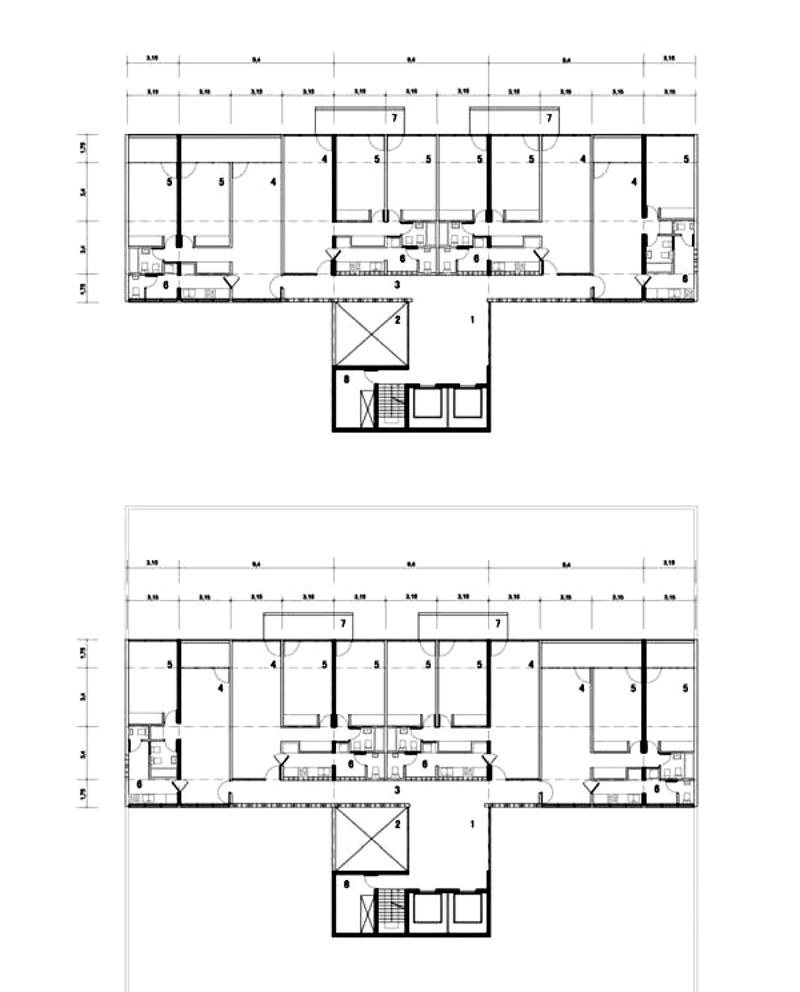
Edificio del Seguro Médico. Residential Block Plan.

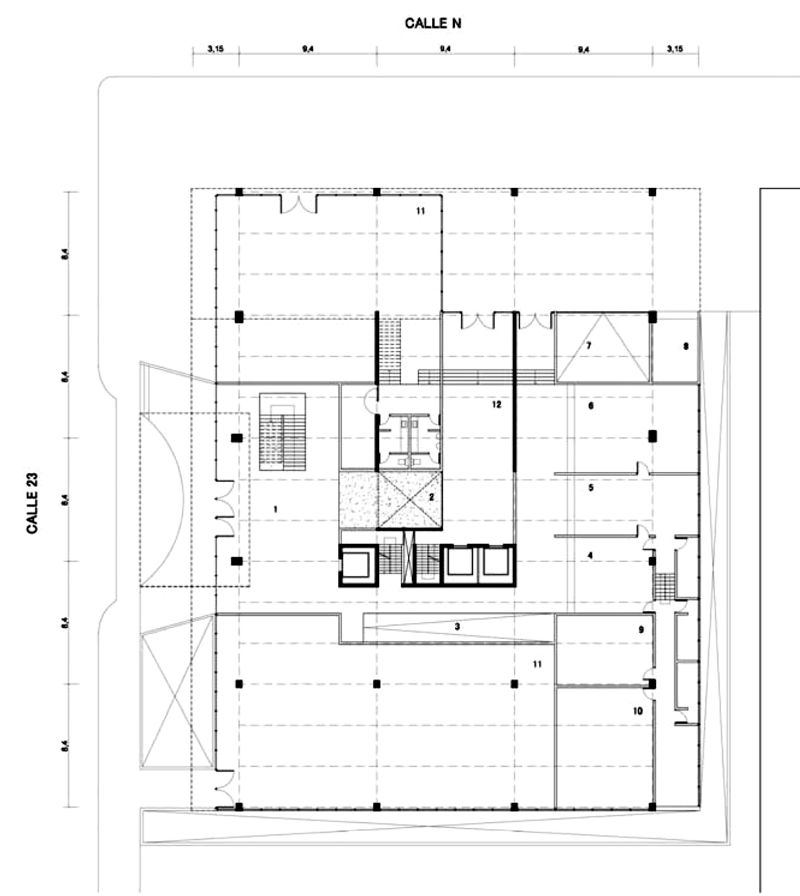
Ground floor plan.

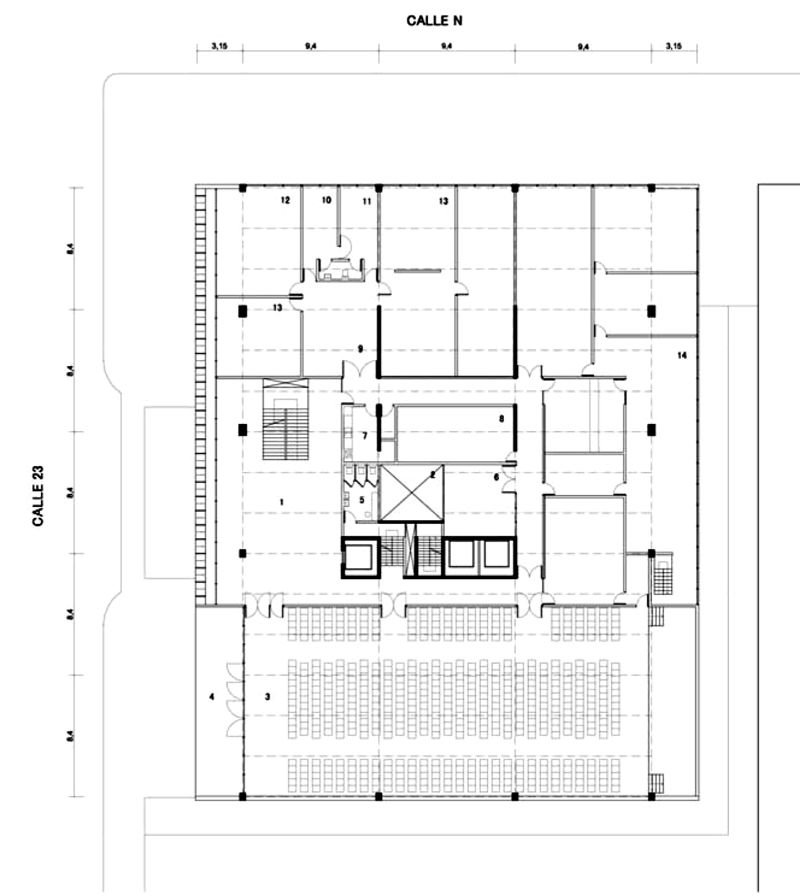
Second-floor plan.

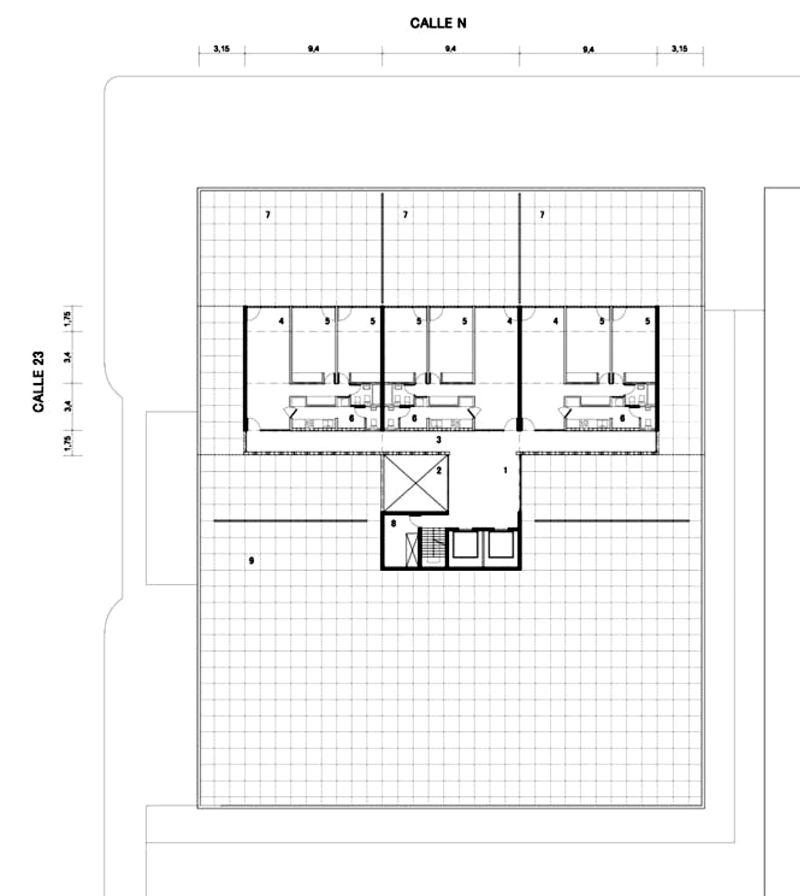
Sixth-floor plan.

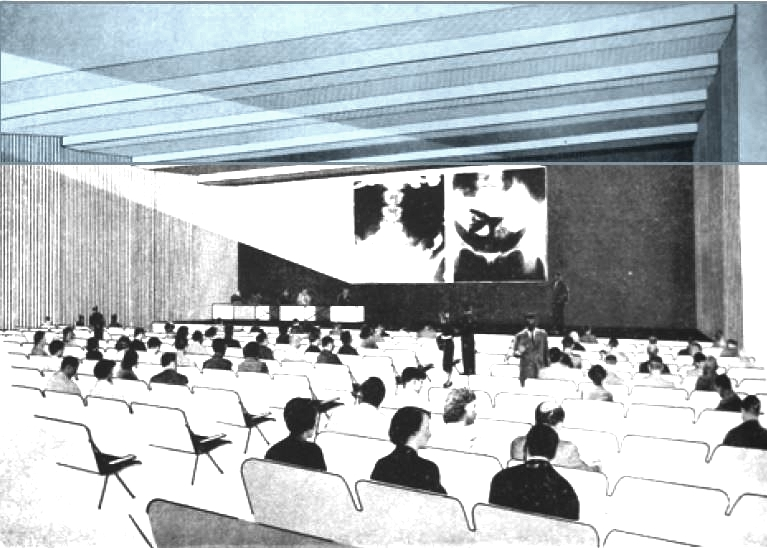
Auditorium. Drawing by Quintana.

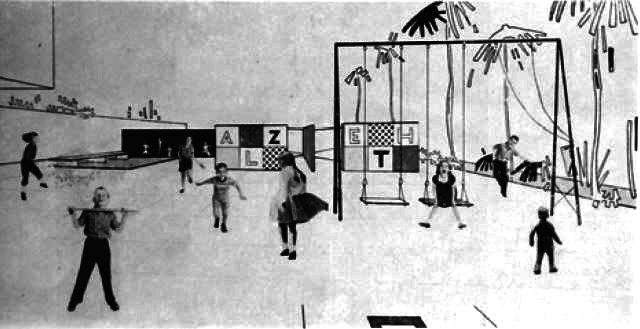
Garden_Sixth Floor. Drawing by Quintana.

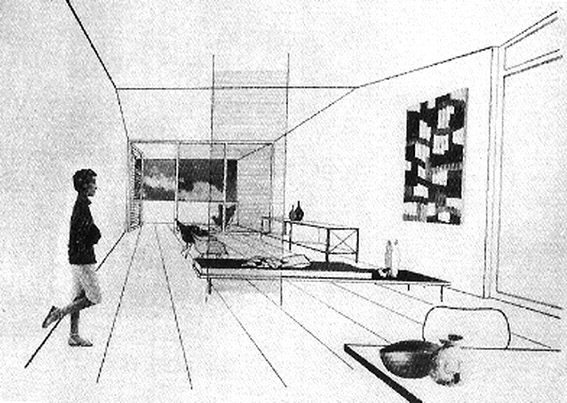
Drawing by Antonio Quintana.

== See also ==
- FOCSA Building
- Rosita De Hornedo
- López Serrano Building
- Plaza del Vapor, Havana
