= La Rampa =

Street in the Vedado district of Havana, Cuba

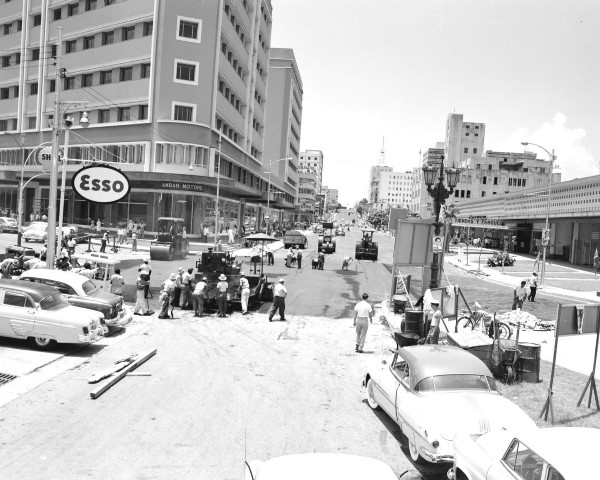
Calle 23

La Rampa (also known as Calle 23) is a main street in the Vedado district of Havana, Cuba. La Rampa runs from Calle L to the Malecón. Built in 1930, the end was the location of the Battery of Santa Clara that protected the city from attack.

== Architecture ==
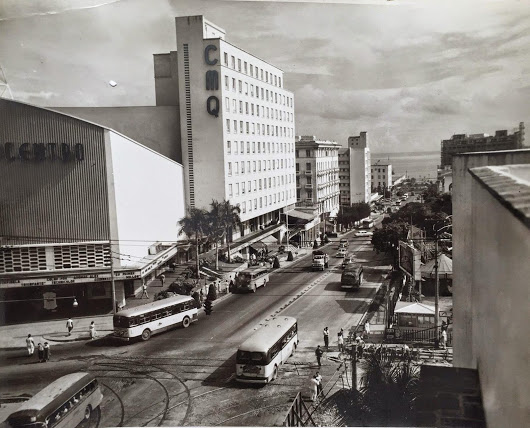
La Rampa - La Habana, 1950s

Calle 23rd passes by airline offices, cinemas, nightclubs, and office buildings. Many hotels, clubs and shops crowd this stretch, such as Hotel Tryp Habana Libre, the former Habana Hilton, and the Hotel Nacional de Cuba. On the corner of 23rd and L is the Radiocentro CMQ Building and further down the block is the Edificio del Seguro Médico by Antonio Quintana Simonetti.
