= Coliseo de la Ciudad Deportiva =

Coordinates: 23.10257°N 82.39304°W

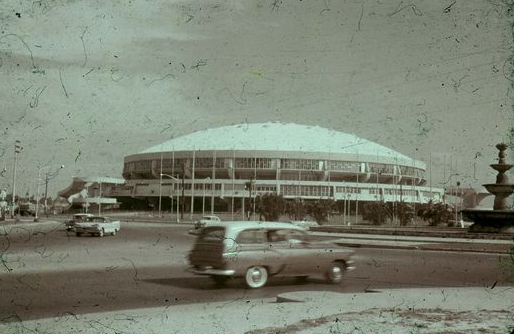
- Interactive map of the Coliseo de la Ciudad Deportiva area

General information
- Type: Coliseum
- Architectural style: International
- Location: Havana, Cuba
- Groundbreaking: November 1952
- Inaugurated: 26 February 1958
- Cost: 4 million pesos (1958)

Dimensions
- Diameter: 103.2 m (339 ft)

Technical details
- Structural system: Dome
- Material: Reinfoced concrete
- Floor area: 20 mil m^{2}

Design and construction
- Architects: Nicolás Arroyo Márquez & Gabriela Menéndez García-Beltrán
- Architecture firm: Arroyo y Menendez Architects
- Developer: Ministerio de Obras Públicas

Coliseo de la Ciudad Deportiva is an indoor sporting arena located in Havana, Cuba. Built in 1957, the Coliseum is one of the most important works of Cuban Civil Engineering. It is located at the intersection of Boyeros and Vía Blanca avenues in the Cerro Municipality. The capacity of the arena is for 15,000 spectators.

== Architecture ==
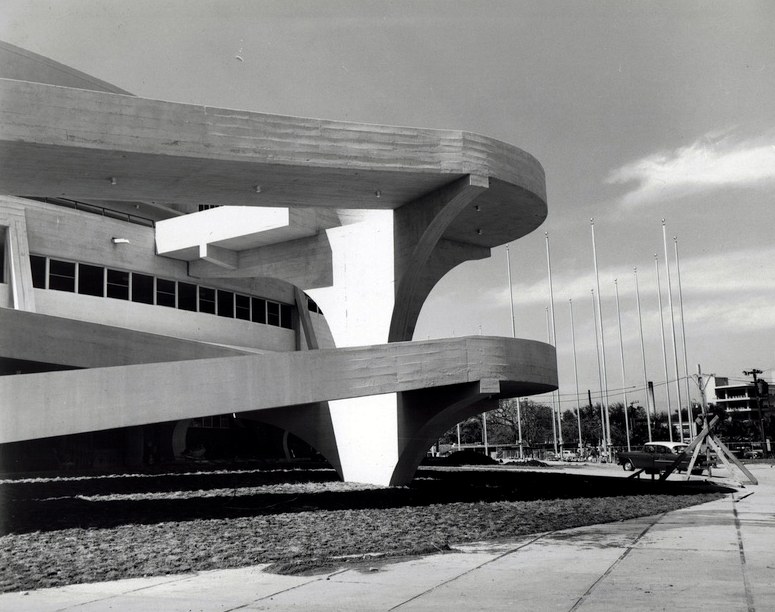
Palacio de los Deportes, Ciudad Deportiva. Havana, Cuba. Nicolás Arroyo & Gabriela Menendez.

The building was designed by Nicolás Arroyo Márquez & Gabriela Menéndez García-Beltrán of the architecture firm Arroyo y Menendez Architects. (Note: Nicolás Arroyo Márquez (Havana, 1917–Potomac MD, 2008) and Gabriela Menéndez García-Beltrán (Havana, 1917–Potomac MD, 2008). He received his architecture degree from the University of Havana in 1941, then married his classmate and fellow architect. Together they formed the hugely influential firm of Arroyo y Menendez Architects, practicing in Cuba until 1959. Among their most notable projects in Cuba are the Coliseo de la Ciudad Deportiva (1955–57), the Havana Plan Piloto (1959, along with Mario Romañach, Josep Lluís Sert and Paul Lester Weiner, the National Theatre of Cuba (1954–60 with Raúl Álvarez), and the Havana Hilton (1958 with Welton Becket and Associates. Arroyo was a member of the American Institute of Architects and served on the United States Commission of Fine Arts from 1971 to 1976.)

Construction of the Coliseum began in November 1952. It is a 20,000 m^{2} circular concrete building with an outside diameter of 103.2 meters and is located at the confluence of the Vía Blanca and Avenida de Rancho Boyeros.

It is supported by 48 columns distributed in two concentric circles of 24 columns each. The inner circle is 62.8 meters in diameter and the outer 88.30. From this last circle, a cantilever with a span of 7.45 meters is projected on which rests a 24 cm thick prestressed concrete plate at a height of 6.65 meters above ground level. The capacity of the building is 15,000 people and one of its most notable aspects is the exit system, which is planned so that all attendees can exit rapidly.

The reinforced concrete dome that covers the facility is 88 meters in diameter without any interior support is supported by a circular post-tensioned concrete beam that rests on the 24 exterior columns, with a seesaw-shaped seat that allows it to carry out the small movements of expansion and contraction due to changes in temperature. This dome was carried out by an American company and the other works were undertaken by the former Ministry of Public Works.

The Coliseum serves indoor sports, it has Volleyball and Basketball courts, Rhythmic Gymnastics, Aerobic Musical Gymnastics, and other recreational activities, it has a Gym located under the stands.

== Sculpture ==
In front of the coliseum, there is a bronze statue of a naked woman running with open arms the work entitled La Meta and is by the sculptor Fernando Boada Martín and made between 1936-1937.

== 1959 trials ==
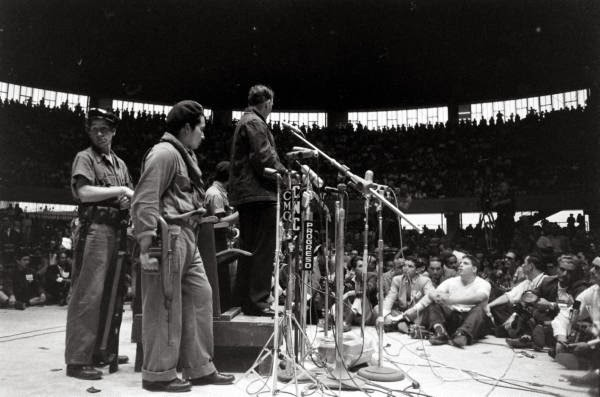
Coliseo de la Ciudad Deportiva_Jesús Sosa Blanco 1959 trial

February 16, 1959, Jesús Sosa Blanco (1907/08 - February 18, 1959) who had been a colonel in the Cuban army under Fulgencio Batista was arrested and charged by the Fidel Castro government with having committed 108 murders under the Batista regime. Sosa's televised trial took place in the Havana Coliseo de la Ciudad Deportiva before 17,000 spectators. Before his execution, he was heard to say that the trial scene was "worthy of ancient Rome". (Note: "Bad Notices. Most of the 350 foreign newsmen, brought to Cuba by Castro for the show, filed shocking reports. They were unaccustomed to the normal standards of Cuban jurisprudence, which permits trials by a panel of judges instead of a jury, admission of hearsay evidence. But they indignantly faulted the trials for the open prejudice of the judges, the popcorn-munching atmosphere, the haste, the catering to the mob's thirst for blood. Cracked one reporter: "Where do the lions come in?" Castro's bad press notices mounted, from Buenos Aires, Rio, Lima, Bogota, Mexico City. "The laurels have been soiled by blood," said Bogota's respected El Tiempo. U.S. opinion was sharply critical, with the notable exceptions of Democratic Congressmen Adam Clayton Powell Jr. (N.Y.) and Charles Porter (Ore.) who journeyed to Cuba at Castro's urging and proclaimed that they "saw no evidence of injustice.Stream of Consciousness. The man behind the show's executions reacted with petulance, incomprehension, irrelevancies, inept concessions. Red-eyed from a cold and plain fatigue, Fidel Castro still tried to run the country from Floor 23 of the Havana Hilton Hotel; he roamed through crushing mobs of sycophants in his $100-a-day suite. The hero's soft, high-pitched voice ran on for 20 hours a day, scolding, demanding, refusing, laughing. The stream of consciousness was mainly concerned with the unfriendly face of the world. "Criticism hurts," Castro admitted, "when coming from Mexico, which once gave me asylum" (TIME Cover, Jan. 26). But "if 20 people make a good jury, why don't thousands of people make a good jury?")

== Interest ==
On March 1, 2016, in honor of the ailing Fidel Castro, The Rolling Stones announced they'd be playing a free concert at the arena on March 25. It was the first open air concert by a British rock band in the country's history. (Note: "The Rolling Stones will perform a groundbreaking concert in Havana, Cuba on Friday March 25, 2016. The free concert will take place at the Ciudad Deportiva de la Habana and will be the first open air concert in the country by a British Rock Band. Always exploring new horizons and true pioneers of rock, the Stones, who have toured every corner of the globe, will bring their high octane performance and incredible music catalogue to the Caribbean for the first time ever.announced they'd be playing a free concert at the arena on March 25, the first open air concert by a British rock band in the country's history.")

== Gallery ==
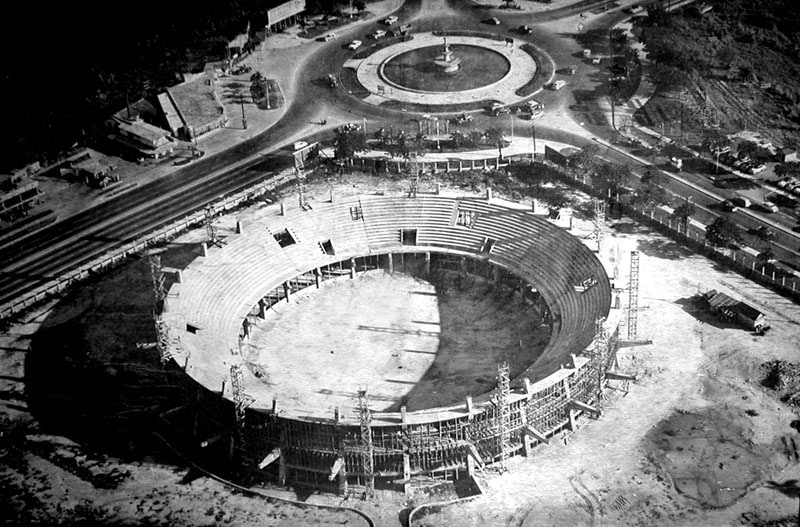
Ciudad Deportiva_under construction

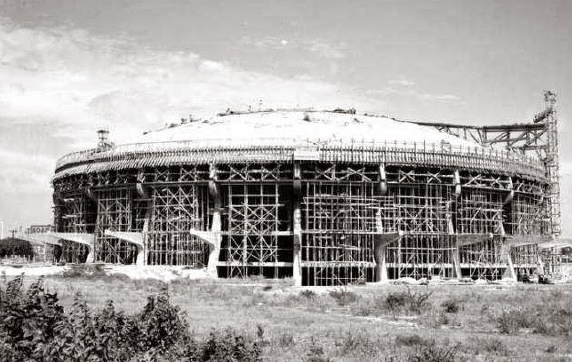
Ciudad Deportiva_under construction.2

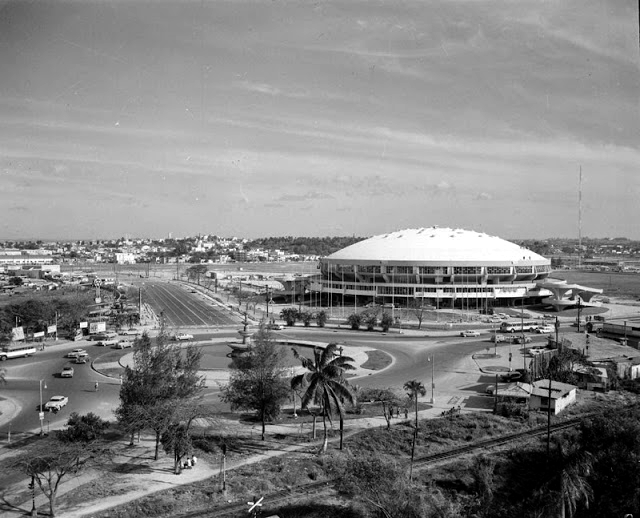
Ciudad Deportiva, Havana

== See also ==
- Havana Plan Piloto
- National Theatre of Cuba
- Mario Romañach
- Josep Lluís Sert
- Town Planning Associates
- Jesús Sosa Blanco
