= List of Cuban architects =

This is a list of Cuban architects.

== Architects ==
- Raúl de Armas (born 1941)
- Nicolas Arroyo (1917–2008)
- Max Borges del Junco (1890–1963)
- Max Borges Jr. (1918–2009)
- Felicia Chateloin (born 1949)
- Mario Girona (1924–2008)
- Leonardo Morales y Pedroso (1887–1965)
- Jesús Permuy (born 1935)
- Matilde Ponce Copado (1932–2001)
- Ricardo Porro (1925–2014)
- Eugenio Rayneri Piedra (1883–1960)
- Mario Romañach (1917–1984)
- Antonio Quintana Simonetti (1919–1993)

== See also ==
- List of architects
- List of Cubans
