= Frank Martínez =

Frank Martínez may refer to:

- Frank Martínez (architect)
- Frank Martínez (artist)
- Frank Martínez (politician)
