= Jesús Sosa Blanco =

Cuban colonel (1907–1959)

- Sosa at his public trial
- Born: December 25, 1907; Jaruco, Cuba
- Died: February 18, 1959 (aged 51); Havana, Cuba
- Cause of death: Execution by firing squad
- Other name: "El Torturador de Oriente" (The Torturer of the East)
- Status: Executed
- Conviction: War crimes
- Penalty: Death

Jesús Sosa Blanco (December 25, 1907 – February 18, 1959) was a colonel in the Cuban army under Fulgencio Batista. After Fidel Castro came to power, Sosa was arrested and charged with having committed 108 murders for Batista. His show trial took place in the Coliseo de la Ciudad Deportiva, before 17,000 spectators. Sosa was given a public trial in January 1959. The trial was televised.

== Trial ==
During his trial, Sosa smiled and laughed at the crowd, which was screaming for him to be killed immediately.

"This is the Colosseum in Rome. I met brave rebels in the mountains, not types like you here. All you do is talk."

The trial lasted through the night. Forty-five witnesses testified against Sosa. One woman, Maria Jacinta Galvez Martinez, said he massacred nearly an entire family. After one of Sosa's men refused to open fire on the family, he had him executed as well.

"This is the worst criminal in the world! He killed every member of the Argote family -my neighbors."

The widow of one of Sosa's victims, Tomasa Batista Castillo, tried to lunge at him. "I begged you not to kill my husband, because of our eleven children," she said. "You said the rebels could raise them." One of Sosa's men said he witnessed his superior personally massacre 17 unarmed farmers.

Sosa's defense attorney was a regular army lawyer who had been cleared of any involvement in war crimes or connections to Batista. He did not dispute the charges against Sosa. However, he did ask for leniency. Sosa's lawyer said Cuba did not have capital punishment when the crimes took place, and that his client was a soldier following orders during a civil war. The trial lasted 13 hours, and the crowd had thinned to about 500 people when the sentencing was finally done at dawn. Sosa was sentenced to death, albeit his execution was delayed so he could appeal.

Sosa had a second hearing on February 18, 1959. During his appeal, he was implicated in more crimes by additional witnesses. His conviction and death sentence were affirmed, and he was executed by firing squad two days later. Before he was shot, Sosa said "I forgive you, and I hope you forgive me." His last words were "Fire." The same month, five of Sosa's men were executed for massacring 19 villagers.

== Reactions ==
The ways the trials were conducted received widespread criticism outside of Cuba. In response, Castro said "Criticism hurts when coming from Mexico, which once gave me asylum. But if 20 people make a good jury, why don't thousands of people make a good jury?"

American media reports on the trials were also sharply negative. However, a minority of reporters and politicians defended the trials. Democratic Congressmen Adam Clayton Powell Jr. and Charles O. Porter, whom Castro invited as observers, both stated that despite the atmosphere of the trials, they saw "no evidence of injustice." Castro said speedy executions were the only way to prevent mass lynchings. He pointed out that the Batista regime had murdered over 20,000 civilians.

The Harvard Crimson said that despite criticism of Cuba's "blood bath", the courts had acquitted dozens of suspected war criminals. The same month Sosa was executed, 24 suspects were acquitted in Santiago de Cuba. Nearly 50 were more were acquitted in Matanzas. Herbert Matthews, a New York Times reporter who secured an exclusive interview with Castro in 1957, called the coverage of the executions the worst he'd ever seen in his entire career.

"In all my 36 years of newspaper work, I have never seen a worse job of journalism than the coverage of the Cuban revolution during the last three weeks. All you saw in most papers was how many people Castro shot. The real picture of a country under Batista's brutal dictatorship was not made clear."

Castro himself called the coverage "the most criminal, vile, and cowardly campaign ever conducted against any people."

After Sosa's trial, other trials and executions were no longer broadcast live. Gabriel García Márquez attended the trial and execution and used the incident as the basis for his 1975 novel, The Autumn of the Patriarch.

== In popular culture ==
In Rachel Kushner's 2008 novel Telex from Cuba, Sosa Blanco is described as having been convicted and imprisoned for murdering his wife, mother-in-law and sister-in-law before Batista released him to help establish the Rural Guard.

== See also ==
* Havana Plan Piloto
- Coliseo de la Ciudad Deportiva
