= Contempora House =

Historic house in New York, United States

- U.S. National Register of Historic Places
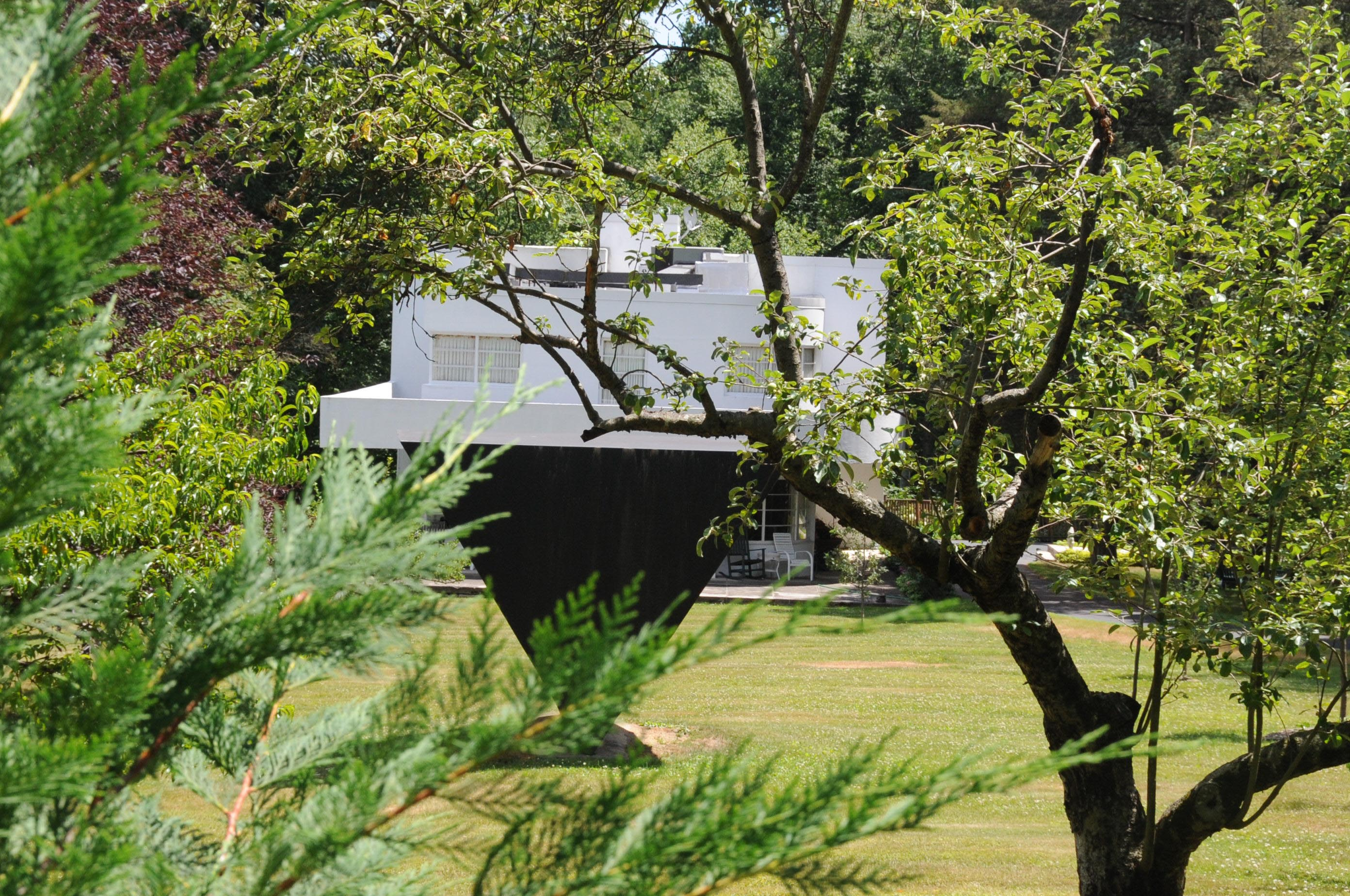

- Location within New York Location within the United States
- Location: 88 S. Mountain Rd., New City, New York
- Coordinates: 41°10′58.18″N 74°1′2.93″W
- Area: 12 acres (4.9 ha)
- Built: 1934
- Architect: Weiner, Paul Lester
- Architectural style: Streamline Moderne
- NRHP reference No.: 09000260
- Added to NRHP: April 29, 2009

Contempora House is a historic home located at New City in Rockland County, New York. It is a Streamline Moderne style dwelling built in 1934–1935. The property consists of the main house with detached studio. The buildings are constructed of concrete and cinderblock with steel and wood framing and a stucco exterior. It was designed by architect and planner Paul Lester Wiener (1895–1967).

It was listed on the National Register of Historic Places in 2009.
