= Town Planning Associates =

US design firm

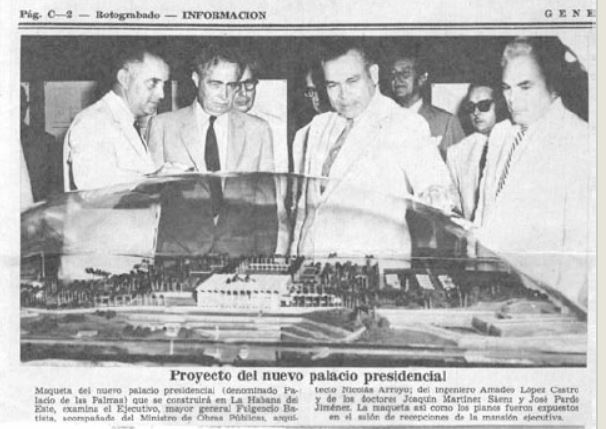
Fulgencio Batista viewing model. Nicolás Arroyo, far left, Paul Lester Wiener in the background to the right of Batista. Unidentified Havana newspaper clipping, July 1958.

Town Planning Associates was a design firm in New York City, active between 1942 and 1959, which included Paul Lester Wiener, Paul Schulz, Josep Lluis Sert. The firm produced urban design and city planning in various new or existing South American cities including, Puerto Ordaz and Maracaibo in Venezuela, Bogotá - Colombia, Chimbote in Peru, and Havana. Sert's master plan for Havana, Havana Plan Piloto, was notable for its integration of natural landscape into new urban and existing building schemes. Town Planning Associates made prominent use of patios and other aspects of Mediterranean architecture adapted to South and Central America. They employed modernist principles of the Congrès Internationaux d'Architecture Moderne (CIAM) and the Athens Charter. The charter got its name from the location of the fourth CIAM conference in 1933, which, due to the deteriorating political situation in Russia, took place on the SS Patris II bound for Athens from Marseille. This conference was documented in a film commissioned by Sigfried Giedion and made by his friend László Moholy-Nagy "Architects' Congress." The Charter had a significant impact on urban planning after World War II and, through Josep Lluis Sert and Paul Lester Wiener, especially on the proposed modernization of Havana.

== History ==
Wiener joined José Luis Sert in 1942 to form Town Planning Associates which operated until 1959, when they finished the Havana Plan Piloto, as an architectural, urban planning, and site planning consultant firm. During this period, Wiener and Sert lectured in the United States and Latin America as experts in urban planning.
Their designs exhibited elements of the "functional city" doctrine that Town Planning Associates promoted the Congrès Internationaux d'Architecture Moderne (CIAM), an organization founded by modern movement architects in 1928. The doctrine was codified in a document called the Athens Charter, drafted at CIAM's fourth meeting in 1933 in Greece.

It also promoted ideas of GATEPAC (Grupo de Artistas y Técnicos Españoles Para la Arquitectura Contemporánea) the Spanish branch of C.I.A.M.

Writing in reference to the writings of Josep Lluís Sert, Joan Ockman notes:

in 1941, he set up the firm Town Planning Associates in New York, joined by Paul Lester Wiener and Paul Schulz. Benefiting from the cultural exchanges fostered under the Roosevelt Administration’s Good Neighbor Policy, Town Planning Associates received their first commission for a model town in Brazil, the Cidade dos Motores (Motor City), intended to accommodate twenty-five thousand industrial and agricultural workers in a site next to an aircraft-engine factory. This unrealized project and a series of others produced over the next dozen years for cities in Peru, Colombia, Venezuela, and Cuba served as testing grounds for the "functional city" doctrine that Sert was instrumental in promoting as a member of the International Congresses for Modern Architecture (CIAM), an organization founded by the leading lights of the modern movement in 1928. The doctrine, which was codified in a summary document called the Athens Charter, drafted at CIAM’s fourth meeting in 1933 in Greece, was premised on strict compartmentalization of the city into four discrete zones—housing, work, recreation, and circulation.

== Gallery ==
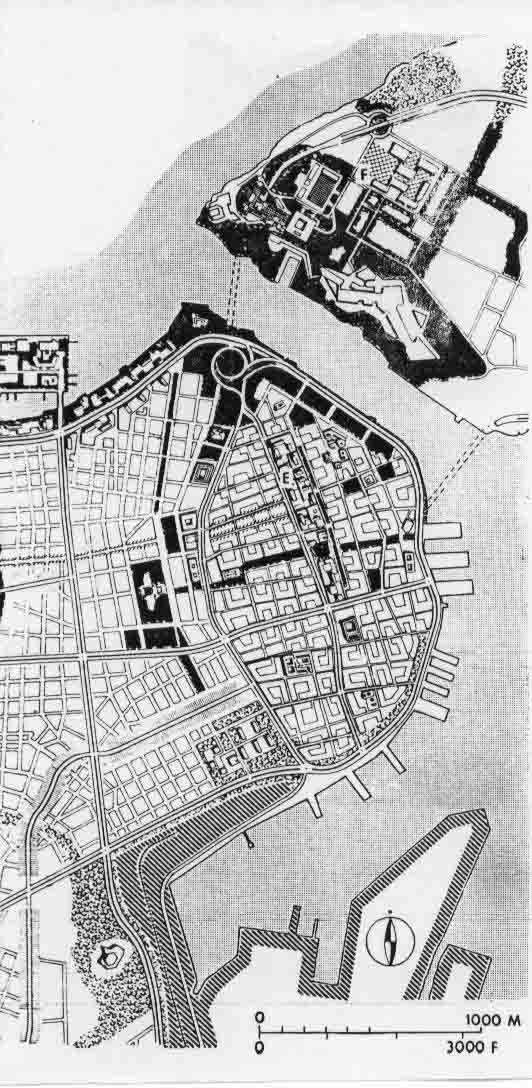
Havana Plan Piloto, plan of the intervention in Old Havana, Town Planning Associates

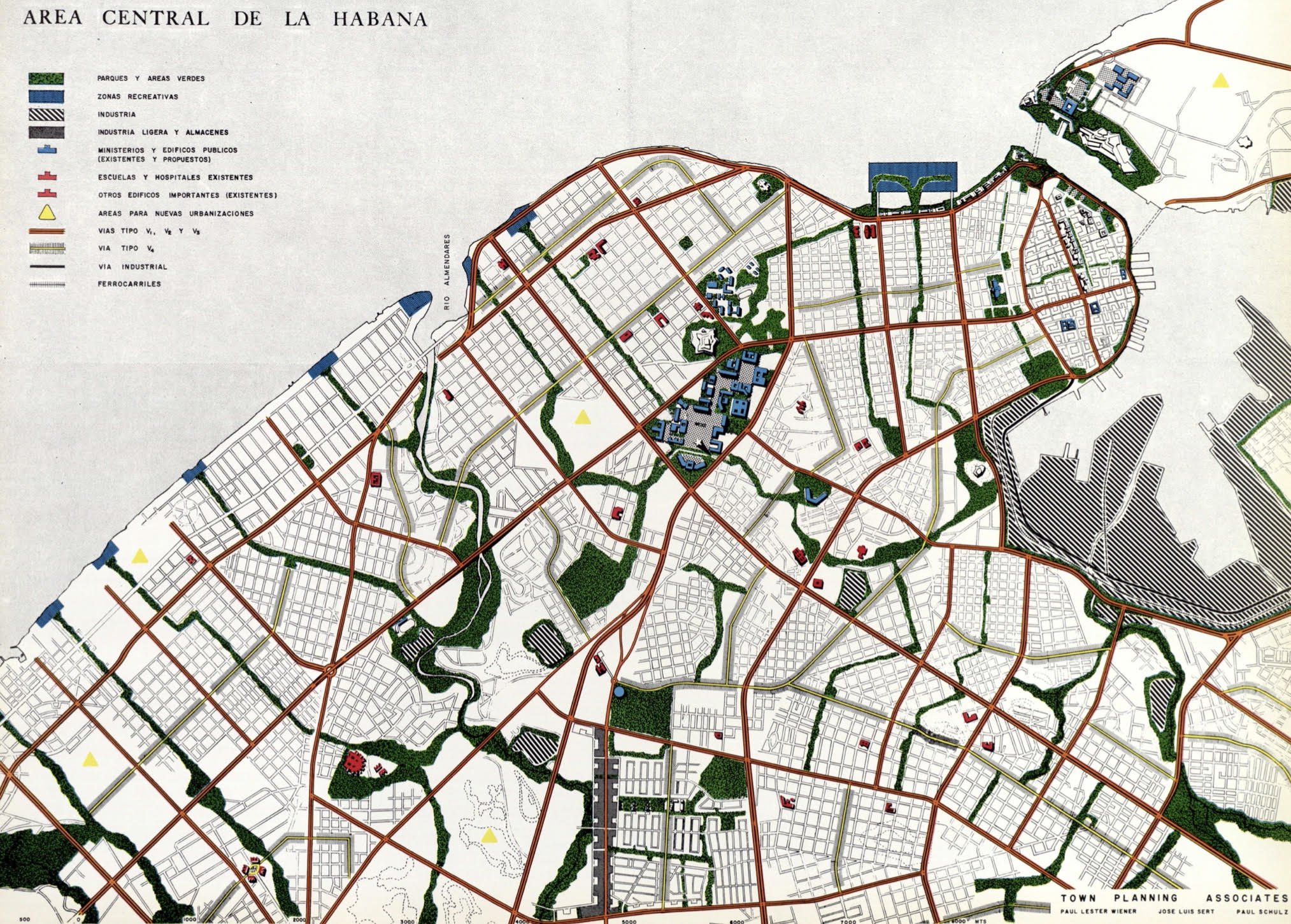
P31 Plan piloto de La Habana, Area Central de La Habana, Havana Plan Piloto, Town Planning Associates

== See also ==
- Mario Romañach
- Jean-Claude Nicolas Forestier
