= Mario Romañach =

Cuban architect

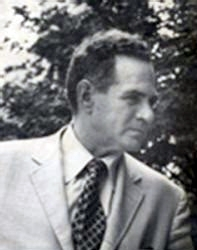
- Born: 1917; Havana, Cuba
- Died: 1984 (aged 66–67); Philadelphia
- Education: University of Havana
- Occupation: Architect
- Spouse: Josefina E. (Odoardo) Romanach (Josefa)
- Partner(s): Silverio Bosh, Maria Cristina Romanach
- Children: 2
- Awards: Gold Medal from the Colegio Nacional de Arquitectos de Cuba
- Buildings: Casa de Jose Noval Cueto, 1949.

Signature
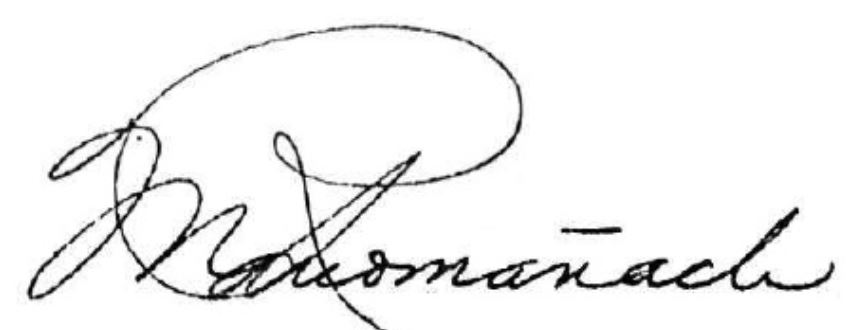

Mario Romañach (1917–1984) was a Cuban modernist architect, planner, and university professor.

== Biography ==
Mario Romañach finished his higher studies at the University of Havana and, along with Max Borges Jr., Frank Martínez, Nicolás Quintana, Ricardo Porro, Antonio Quintana Simonetti and Emilio del Junco, was one of the architects students who participated in the "Burning of Vignola" event. They sought to rebel against the education system in force until then in Cuba. The event took place in the courtyard of the School of Architecture of the University of Havana in 1944, when a group of students and recent graduates burned several copies of the Practical Elemental Treaty of Architecture or Study of the Five Orders of Vignola (1507-1573), exponent of the teaching of classical architecture. From this date, Mario Romañach began his career as one of the most outstanding professionals of modern architecture in Cuba.

== 1956 Plan Piloto ==
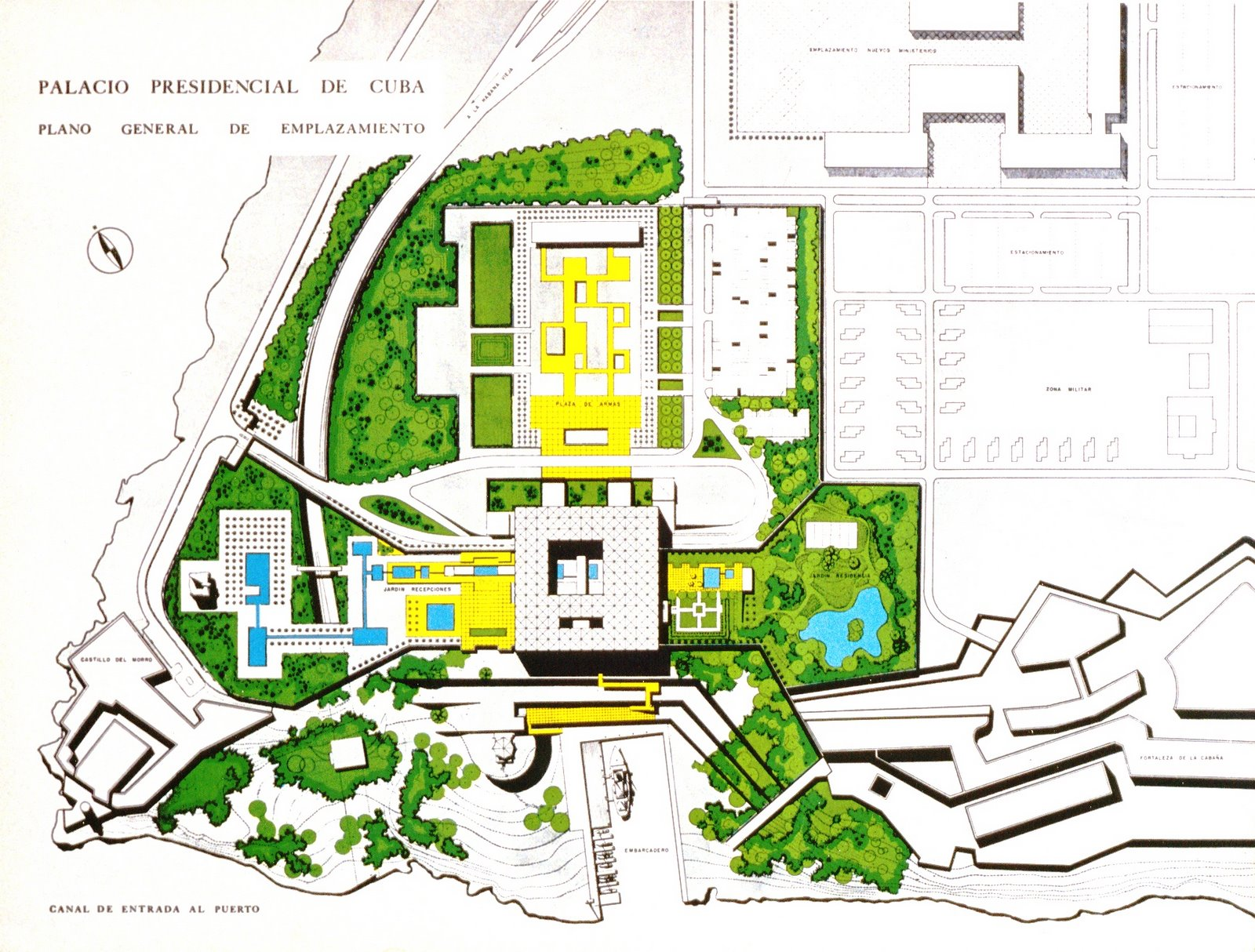
Plan Piloto de la Habana. 1956. Mario Romañach, Gabriela Menéndez and Josep Lluís Sert's design for the new Presidential Palace near the Castle of San Carlos de La Cabaña.

"Fulgencio Batista in the modernity of the 50s hires the important Catalan architect Josep Lluis Sert who had worked with Le Corbusier in his atelier on Rue de Sevres 35 in Paris. Sert elaborates the Havana Master Plan in collaboration with Paul Lester Wiener and Paul Schulz in 1956. For the Republic of Cuba, the architects Nicolás Arroyo, Minister of Public Works of the Batista government and the talented architect Mario Romañach participate in its construction."

Mario Romañach, collaborated on the Plan Piloto under the auspices of the Minister of Public Works, and the National Planning Board of Cuba between 1955 and 1958, in the development of the Plan Piloto for Havana. The Town Planning Associates, a consulting firm from New York, led by the Catalan architect Josep Lluís Sert, and its partners Paul Lester Wiener and Paul Schulz, was hired by the Minister of Public Works with the intention of guiding the development of the continuous growth of the city of Havana during the next decade. The entire metropolitan area of Havana would have been affected by the Plan Piloto which included recommendations for the development of unbuilt areas and the distribution of the four functions of the Athens Charter as outlined by Le Corbusier's manifesto for urban planning published in 1943 for the Congrès Internationaux d'Architecture Moderne resulting in "The Functional City" through new, modernist zoning. The most significant element of the Pilot Plan was a comprehensive transportation system for Havana. The aim of the Plan was to contain the different efforts of the various historical periods within the city planning conceptual order. The Sert and Wiener Plan focused on providing improved accessibility for traffic to the heart of the old city. "Two major north-south dual carriageways were planned to cut through the center of the Old Havana on Calle Cuba and Calle Habana. A further dual carriageway was to cut through the center on an east-west axis along Calle Muralla, and alternate streets on the city grid in both directions were to be widened. In true ‘tabula rasa’ fashion the city blocks in the entire area enclosed by these dual carriageways were to be demolished and replaced with a series of classic modernist slab blocks." The remaining blocks were to be hollowed out in order to improve automobile access and parking, demolition would have been required to accommodate the widening of other streets. The Pilot Plan would have resulted in the division of the old city into four quarters separated by major traffic lanes, widespread demolition of historic buildings and with the character of remaining city blocks being fundamentally altered.

The Plan Piloto included the project by Romañach, Gabriela Menéndez and Josep Lluís Sert for the new Presidential Palace, which would be located near the Castle of San Carlos de La Cabaña and the Castle of the Three Kings of El Morro, a work that was never executed.

== Notable projects ==
In 1944 he worked with the architects Pedro Martínez Inclán and Antonio Quintana in the Residencial Obrero de Luyanó neighborhood, located in an area south of Havana Bay. The project was project was an exercise of modern architecture. It had 1,500 homes, eight apartment complexes in four-story buildings and all complementary services: markets, schools, sports fields and parks.

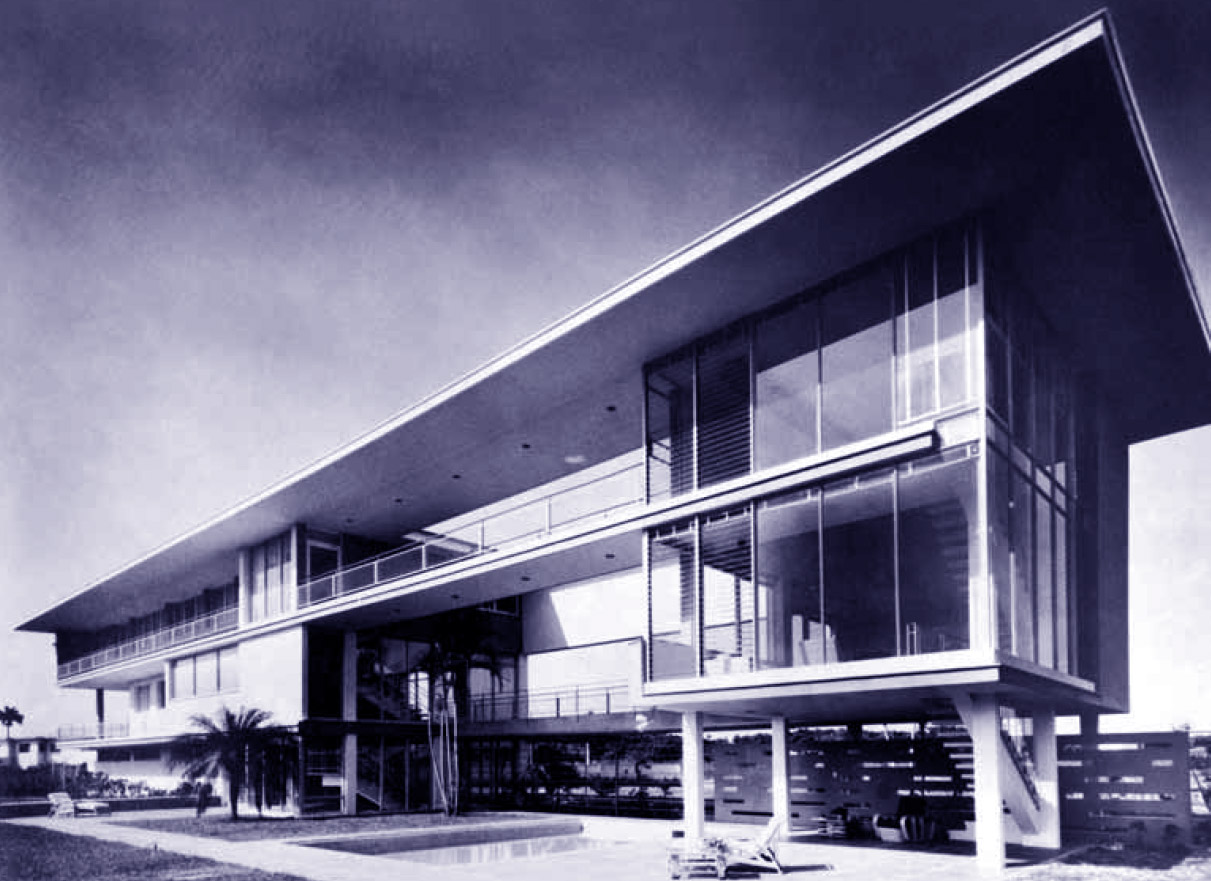
Mario-Romanach and Silverio-Bosch. Casa-de-Jose-Noval-Cueto-1949. Located at 17A between 174 and 190, Cubanacán.

In 1949 he won with his partner, architect Silverio Bosh, the Gold Medal from the Colegio Nacional de Arquitectos de Cuba for the house of José Noval Cueto. This residence is emblematic of Cuban architecture and an example of rationalism in Havana; it is an modern interpretation of traditional Cuban residential architecture. The house is an elongated prism, the typical white box, to which a portion is subtracted, and thus creates a kind of "inner courtyard", like the Cuban colonial house. The volumes separated by this "patio" are joined by two galleries that connect them. It complies with the rationalist dictates to the letter: free floor plan, continuous windows, a free facade, pilotis, etc. The house is not only exceptional for its extraordinary visual values, but also for its amazing adaptation to the Cuban tropical climate.

With the use of the brise soleil of Le Corbusier, Mario Romañach maintained rationalist design principles as adapted to a tropical environment. In the search for a regional architecture, a dialectical dialogue was developed between the formal principles of the modern movement (Momo) and the vernacular solutions offered by the Cuban colonial dwelling.

It is interesting to note the influence of Japanese architecture, a culture for which he had a special predilection in works such as the house of Rufino Álvarez, built in 1957 and located in 214 between 13 and 15, Siboney, Playa, or in the house of Ana Carolina Font, 1956, built in 216 A between 7th. A and 9th., Siboney, Playa. In both, this influence is evident in the horizontality, the adaptation and respect for the surrounding nature, the arrangement of its roofs and the expression of the structure; In addition, the use of wood in details such as railings, lattices. These two houses are the best works of Romañach. The architect's attentiveness for the building's adaptation to climate is evident.

Among other residences in Havana with similar characteristics is the house of Manuel Saavedra, of 1951, located in Miramar, and the residence for Evangelina Aristigueta de Vidaña, 1953, located at 146 between 23 and 25, Cubanacán.

Overall his architectural work encompasses two types: residential and multi-functional buildings for private companies.

Among the buildings in Havana are: Peletería "California", built in 1951 and located on Calle Galiano between San José and Barcelona, with a modern interior and ample support spaces; the apartment of Josefina Odoardo from 1953, located in 7th. Between 62 and 66, Miramar, with use of ceramic lattices, outdoor staircases, and roofless terraces, the latter with rectangular wooden rails; the building of Oswaldo Pardo, of 1954, located in 98 between 5ta. Avenida, F and 7th., Miramar, reinforces the exterior, vertical shape reinforced by entrances and projections in which the Miami wooden windows protrude, the built-in brick closets, used on all the walls of the building, and the side terraces with rectangular wooden rails. Its interior is simple, with few walls so that ventilation is not compromised.

Among these works include the apartment building of Guillermo Alonso, designed with Silverio Bosh in 1950 and located at No. 8 between 5ta. and 7th avenues, Miramar, is composed by two rationalist blocks around large, green spaces, which act as an inner courtyard. Also stands out the apartment building for Evangelina Aristigueta de Vidaña for its formal simplicity and its strong Cuban identity, given in a series of details such as the use of traditional materials of the country's architecture, presence of lattices and stained glass windows, is found in the corner of 7th and 60, in Miramar, Playa.

The apartment building of The Goods and Bonds Investment Co., built between 1956 and 1958, is located at C Street between 29th Street and Zapata in El Vedado. The building has a relatively simple overall form, while its façade is articulated through the repetition and variation of modular elements. Interior details, including the staircase and handrails, have been interpreted as reflecting Romañach's interest in Japanese design.

At the time of his death, he was designing a single family residence in Gladwyne, Pennsylvania.

== Academic ==
In 1959 and thereafter Mario Romañach was a professor at the universities of Harvard, Cornell and at the University of Pennsylvania teaching architectural design at the professional level. In the 70s he played a key role in the Architecture Career at the Simón Bolívar University in Caracas, where he participated in its conceptualization, academic definition, and orientation.

"Mr. Romanach (was) chairman of the University of Pennsylvania department of architecture from 1971 to 1974."

In 1979, he was appointed a member of the National Academy of Design.

Mario Romañach incorporated traditional architecture solutions into a process of synthesis, drawing on the works of Western modernist architects and traditional Japanese architecture. This approach contributed to the development of a modern regionalist architectural language in his work. He is regarded as an important figure in Cuban architecture of the 1950s.

At the end of his career in Cuba, Romañach had reached a high level of formal architectural elaboration and integration that was departing from the mid-century modernist architectural canon. He anticipated the contradictions that led some to confront Latin American architecture with the ascetic rationalism of the European modern movement. He died in the United States on March 8, 1984.

== Works and Projects ==
Between 1945 and 1955 he designed and built 58 works including private houses, apartments and various public buildings.

Cuba

Barrio Obrero de Luyanó (1944–48) together with Quintana and Pedro Martínez

House of Julia Cueto de Noval (1948)

Jose Noval Cueto House (1948-49)

Residence of Mario Romañach (1949)

Ana Fonte de Beato Building (1949) Guillermo Alonso apartment building (1950)

House of Manuel Saavedra (1951)

California Fur Shop (1951) Flogar Department Store (1951-56)

House of Evangelina Aristigueta de Vidaña (Luis Alberto and Evangelina Vidaña) (1953)

Josefina Odoardo's apartment building (1953)

Oswaldo Pardo's apartment building (1954)

House of Vicente Pardo (1955) House of Felix Carvajal (1955)

House of Beatriz Baguer (1955)

House of Maria Dolores Puig (1955)

The Mothers' Club (1956)

Evangelina Aristigueta de Vidaña's apartment building (1956)

Apartment building of the Compañía de Inversiones en Bienes y Bonos, S.A (1956-58)

House of Ana Carolina Font (1956)

Martha Gabriel Hose (1957)

House of Rufino Alvarez (1957)

House of Guillermina de Soto Bonavia (1957)

Project for the National Bank of Cuba (1958)

Model houses for the development of Santa Catalina, together with Emilio del Junco (1958)

House of Ernesto Suarez (1959)

U.S.

Chatham Towers, New York City (1967)

== Obituary ==
The New York Times. MARCH 11, 1984:

Mario Romanach, 66; Architect and Planner

— Mario J. Romanach, a professor of architecture at the University of Pennsylvania's School of Design, and best known for his work in Cuba, died Thursday in Philadelphia of a heart ailment. He was 66 years old. Mr. Romanach, chairman of the university's department of architecture from 1971 to 1974, was a fellow of the American Institute of Architects and a member of the National Academy of Design. His work in community planning in Havana built Mr. Romanach's reputation. He left Cuba in 1959 to teach architecture at Harvard University. He later formed an architectural firm, Romanach Partnership, with his daughter Maria Cristina Romanach. He is survived by his wife, Josefa, another daughter, Josephine Alger, and a granddaughter. A memorial service will be held March 23 at the University of Pennsylvania.

== Gallery ==
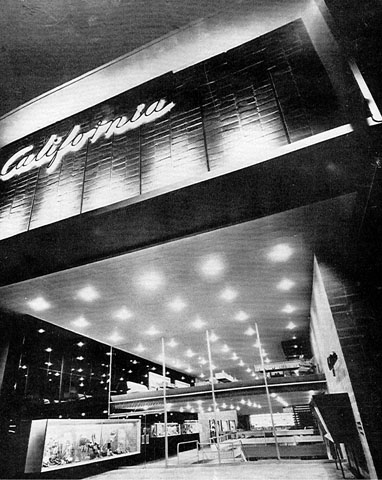
Peletería "California". Mario Romañach 1951.

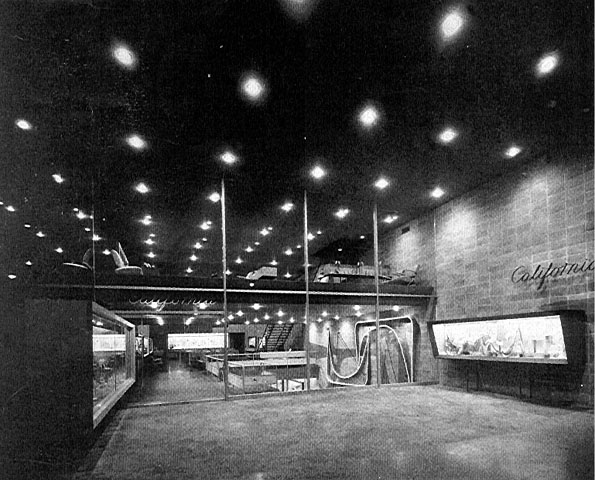
Peletería "California". Mario Romañach 1951.

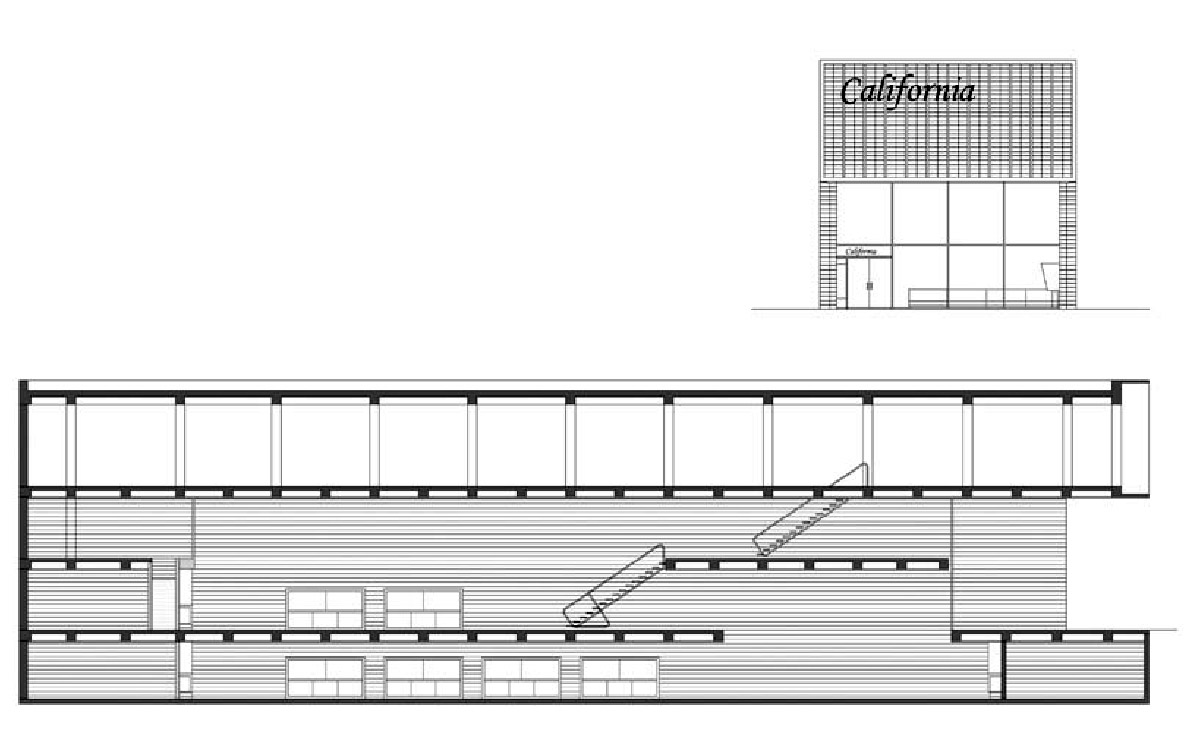
Peletería "California". Mario Romañach 1951.

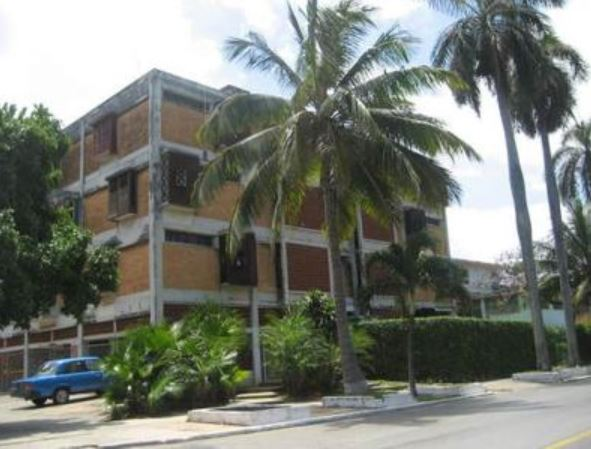
Mario Romañach_Edifico de Evangelina Aristigueta. 1956

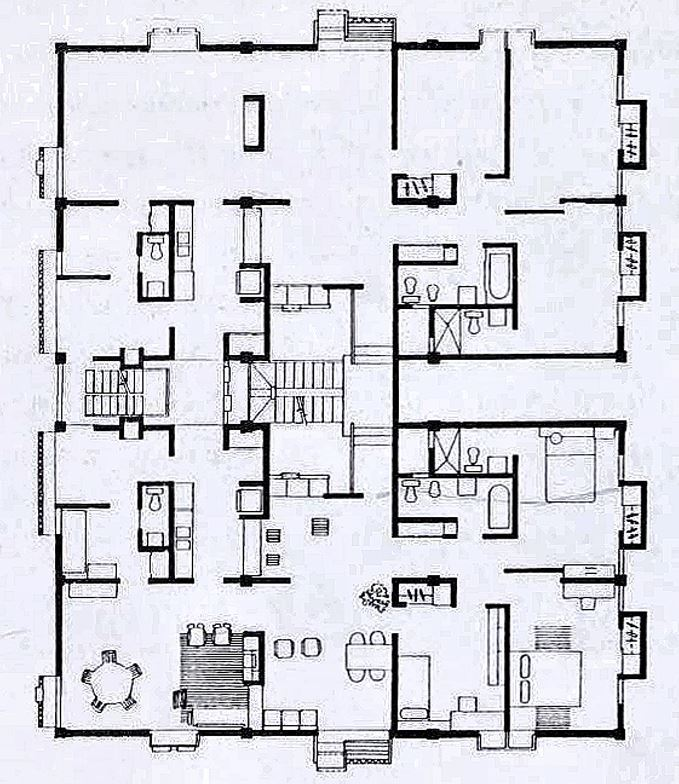
Mario Romañach_Edifico de Evangelina Aristigueta. 1956

== See also ==
- Havana Plan Piloto
- Josep Lluís Sert
- Town Planning Associates

== Bibliography ==
- EnCaribe: Mario Romañach
- Quintana, Nicolás: Arquitectura y Urbanismo en la República de Cuba (1902-1958)… Antecedentes, Evolución y Estructuras de Apoyo. Lasa International. 16 de agosto de 2001. 20 p., páginas 13 a 15, 18 y 19
- Lorea, José Ramón Alonso: A modo de apuntes para un lector interesado: Arquitectura Cubana Siglo XX
- Coyula, Mario: La lección de Alamar. Espacio Laical, abril de 2011
