= Matilde Ponce Copado =

Cuban architect

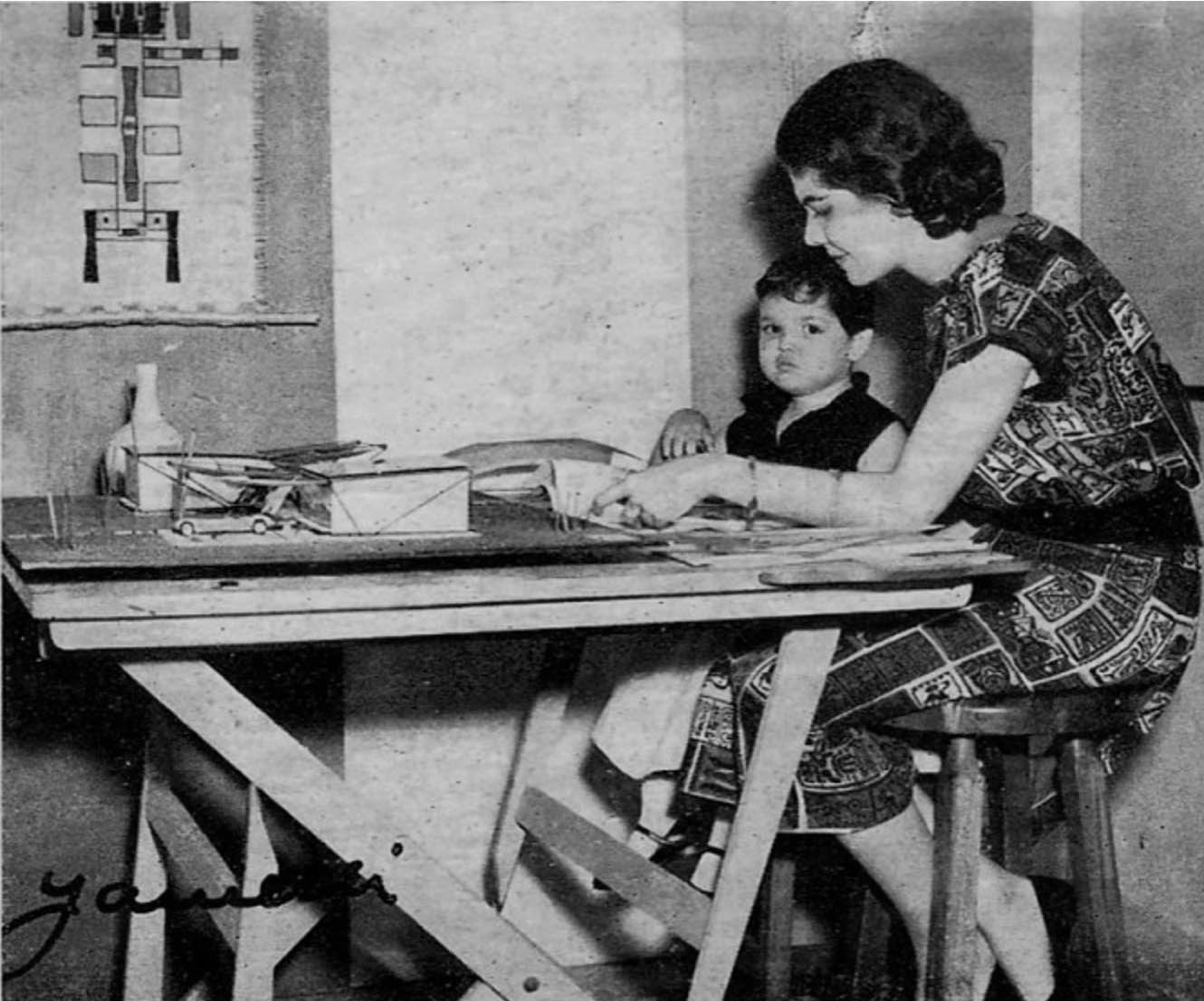
- Ponce Copado in 1958 with her son
- Born: March 14, 1932; Trinidad, Santa Clara Province, Cuba
- Died: 2001
- Education: University of Havana
- Spouse: Antonio Quintana Simonetti

Matilde Ponce Copado (1932 – 2001) was a Cuban architect, known for her modernist designs.

== Biography ==
Matilde Ponce Copado was born in Trinidad, Santa Clara Province, Cuba on March 14, 1932. Ponce attended the Instituto de Segunda Enseñanza del Vedado in Vedado. She matriculated at the University of Havana in 1949, graduating from the school in 1955.

Following graduation, Ponce worked at the Municipal Urban Department in Havana where she designed a number of public projects.

Ponce married Antonio Quintana Simonetti, a fellow architect who had taught Ponce at the University of Havana. The couple collaborated on a number of projects.
