= Colegio Nacional de Arquitectos de Cuba =

Building in Ciudad de La Habana, Cuba

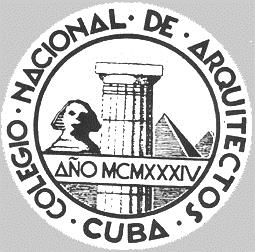
- C.N.A.C. logo

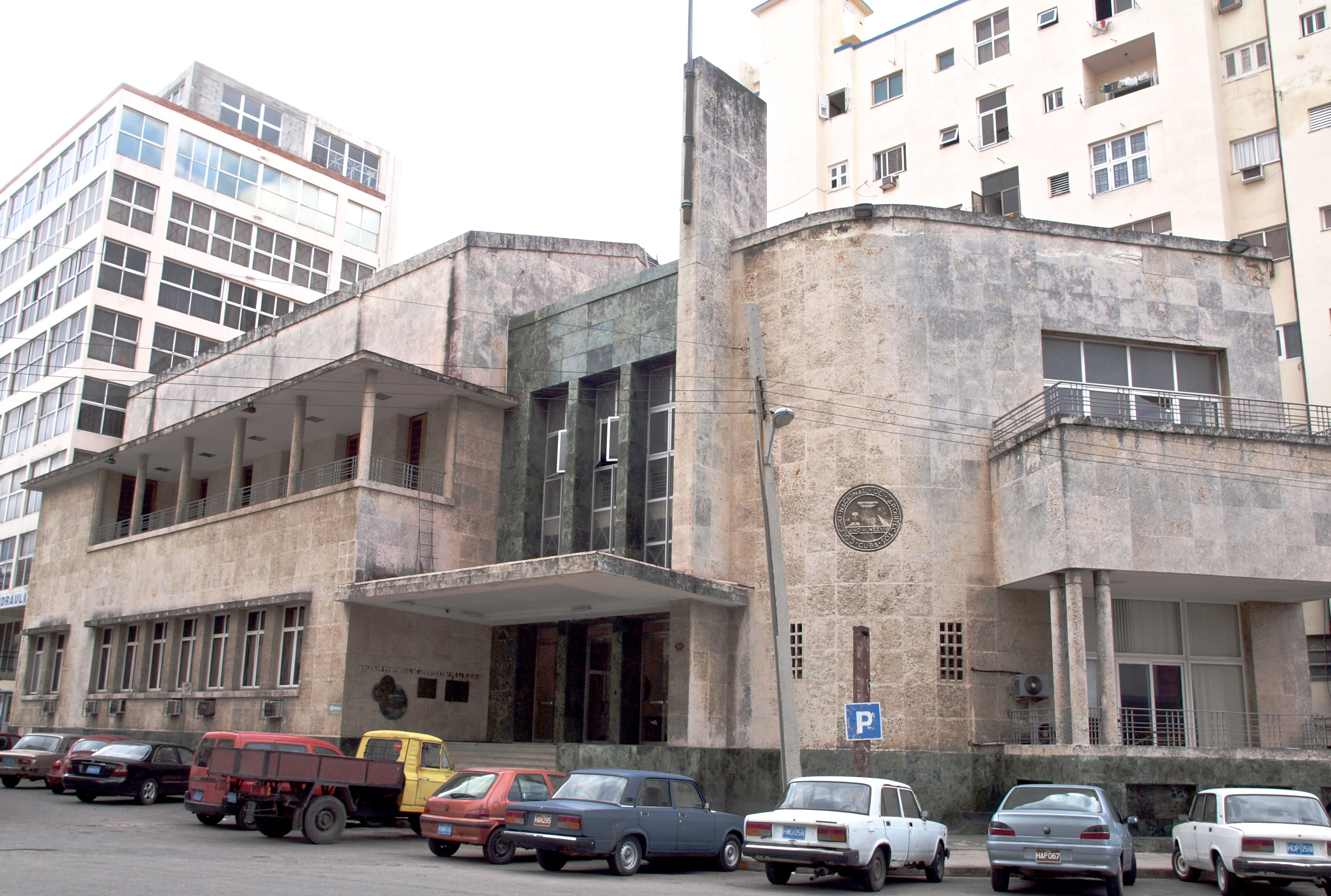
- Corner of Calles Infanta and Humboldt
- Interactive map of the Colegio Nacional de Arquitectos de Cuba area

General information
- Type: Office
- Architectural style: Art deco
- Location: El Vedado, Avenida Infanta y Calle 104 Humboldt, Ciudad de La Habana, Cuba
- Coordinates: 23.1418°N 82.3788°W
- Estimated completion: 1926
- Renovated: March 13, 1947
- Owner: Revolutionary government (contested) (Note: This theft of private property led the U.S. into severing diplomatic relations in 1961 and installing the trade embargo and various sanctions against Cuba. "Thousands of Americans and Cuban citizens suffered humiliation and financial distresses of having their private property stolen from them, some of them at gunpoint. Today there has been no justice for that their claims.")

Height
- Height: 12.19 m (40.0 ft)

Technical details
- Material: Coral stone
- Floor count: 3
- Floor area: 232.25 square meters

Design and construction
- Architects: Fernando de Zárraga & Mario Esquiroz

Other information
- Number of rooms: 28

Colegio Nacional de Arquitectos de Cuba (CNAC; English: National College of Architects of Cuba) is a Cuban national institution for architects, based in Havana.

== History ==
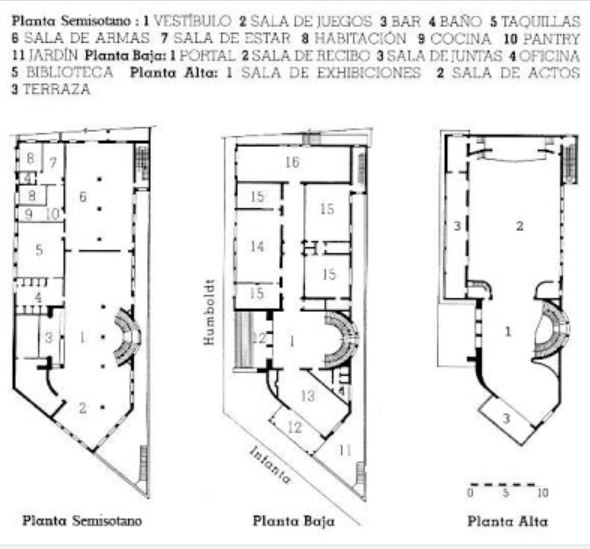

=== Founding ===
CNAC was established by the Provincial Colleges of Architects in Havana on 13 March 1916, after legislation was passed requiring licensing of architects.

=== Legal ===
On 5 April 1916, at a meeting held at Tacón Street No. 2, with the presence of the architects Gabriel Román Casals, Rogelio Santana Fernández, Jorge Broderman de Vignier and Lorenzo Rodríguez Ubals, the following minutes were drawn up:

The gentlemen who, at the margin, expresses themselves in the session, are in the chair, at the request of those present Mr. Gabriel Román Casals, who explains the reason for the citation, noting the disagreeable situation that the professional architects find with respect to the works that are executed in this city and the technical and artistic deficiencies that almost all of them suffers and understands that it is convenient, both for professional architects and for the beautification of our capital and guarantee of the owners, to ensure that the works that are built in the future, have a real facultative direction in the achievement of these purposes, forming an association (COLLEGE OF ARCHITECTS) to ensure compliance with current laws and greater prestige of the profession.

== Architecture ==
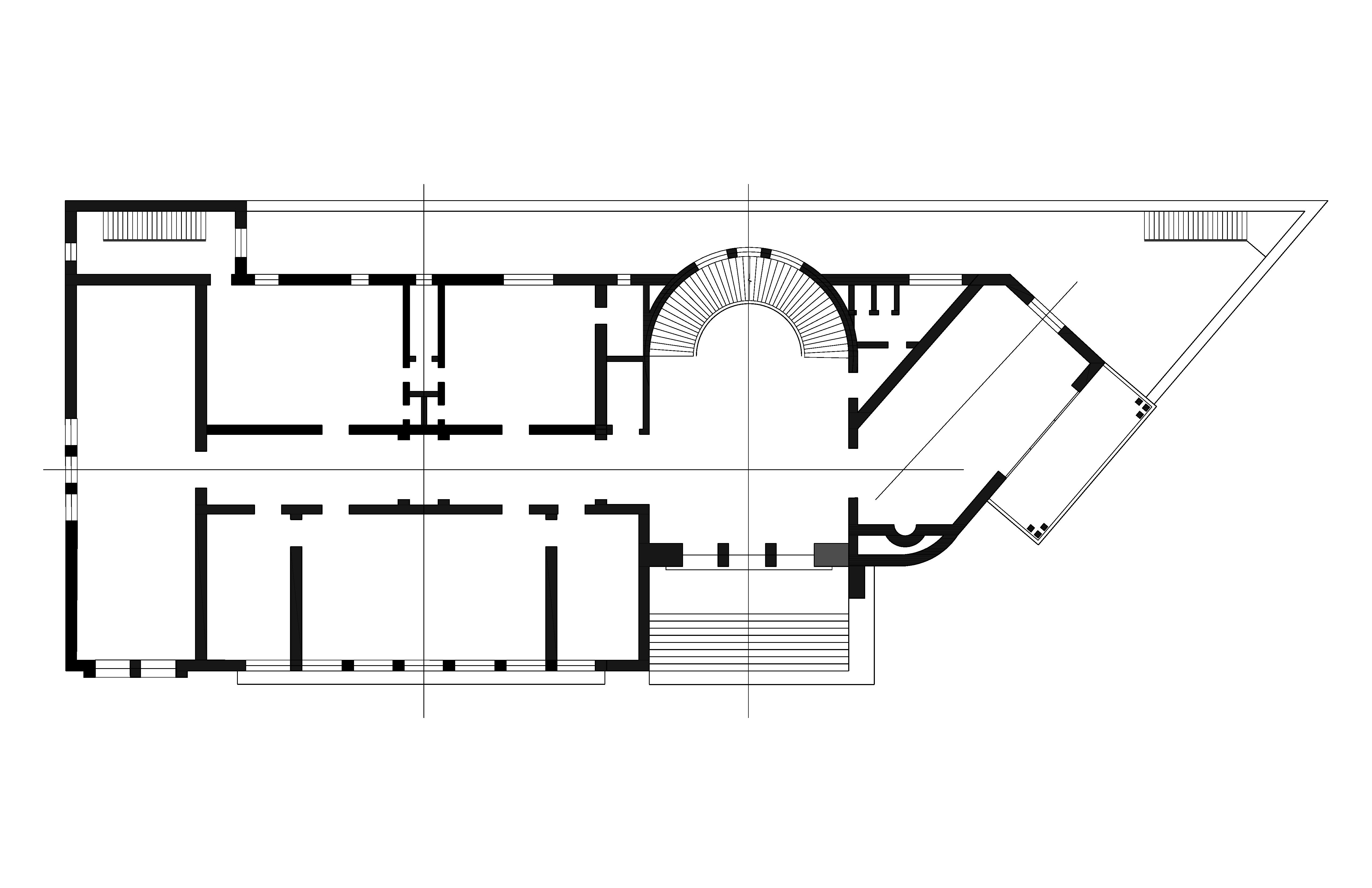
Colegio Nacional de Arquitectos de Cuba. Floor Plan

The circulation of the Colegio Nacional de Arquitectos building is through a double-loaded corridor. It was one of the first curtain walls to be used in Cuba. The building consists of a semi-basement and two floors that houses offices, a library, recreation rooms, an auditorium, and a large spiral staircase that forms a large space on three levels which is illuminated by natural light from three panels of glass blocks. It has several outdoor porches. On the outside, coral stone and green Cuban marble are used. The main part of the building (auditorium) is covered by a gable roof, the rest of the building has a flat roof.

== Directors ==
In 1928 the board was formed by Esteban Rodríguez Castells who was the first vice president, Emilio de Soto, the second vice president, Miguel Ángel Moenck served as treasurer and Alberto Camacho was the librarian, artistic director of the magazine and member of the Legal and Advertising Commission.

Other members were the architects Joaquín Weiss, Enrique Luis Varela, Pedro Martínez Inclán and Pérez Benitoa, who was a member of the Foreign Affairs Committee.

Between 1950 and 1961, they occupied the presidency, Rene Echarte Mazorra, Pedro Guerra Seguí, Agustín Sorhegui Vázquez, Vicente J. Salles Burell, Horacio Navarrete Serrano and Rodulfo Ibarra Pérez.

== Decree-Law No. 3174 ==
The Colegio Nacional de Arquitectos de Cuba emerged as a result of Decree-Law No. 3174 of the Ministry of Public Works on December 13, 1933. The Colegio had six provincial headquarters throughout the country. The law established that all work built in the country should have the approval of the school. Segunda Zafra presents the list of architects who formed part of the National College of Architects of Cuba in 1940, its executive committee, its Provincial Colleges and its Honorary and Correspondent partners, both in Cuba and abroad. National College of Architects of Cuba (1916). As of December 31, 1958, there were 676 architects licensed and registered in the National College of which 590 were in the Provincial College of Havana.

In 1924, proposals were requested and the project was awarded to Architect César Guerra. In 1926 the building was finished, however soon thereafter it was discovered that the building was too small to include many of the required functions. In 1945 proposals were once again accepted for the enlargement of the existing building. The new building by architects Esquiroz and Zarraga resulted in a total reconstruction of the existing building.

== Other organizations ==
In 1932 the Federation of Architects of Cuba was created, which grouped the professionals who began to practice outside of Havana, until the 1950s had about 90% of architects based in the capital.

== Annual prize ==
- 1953, Tropicana Club, Ciudad de La Habana, Cuba; Max Borges Jr. (1918–2009), architect
- 1956, gold medal by the School of Architects in Havana, Retiro Odontologico Building; Antonio Quintana Simonetti (1919–1943), Architect
- 1959, Edificio del Seguro Médico, Havana; Antonio Quintana Simonetti (1919–1943), architect

== Gallery ==
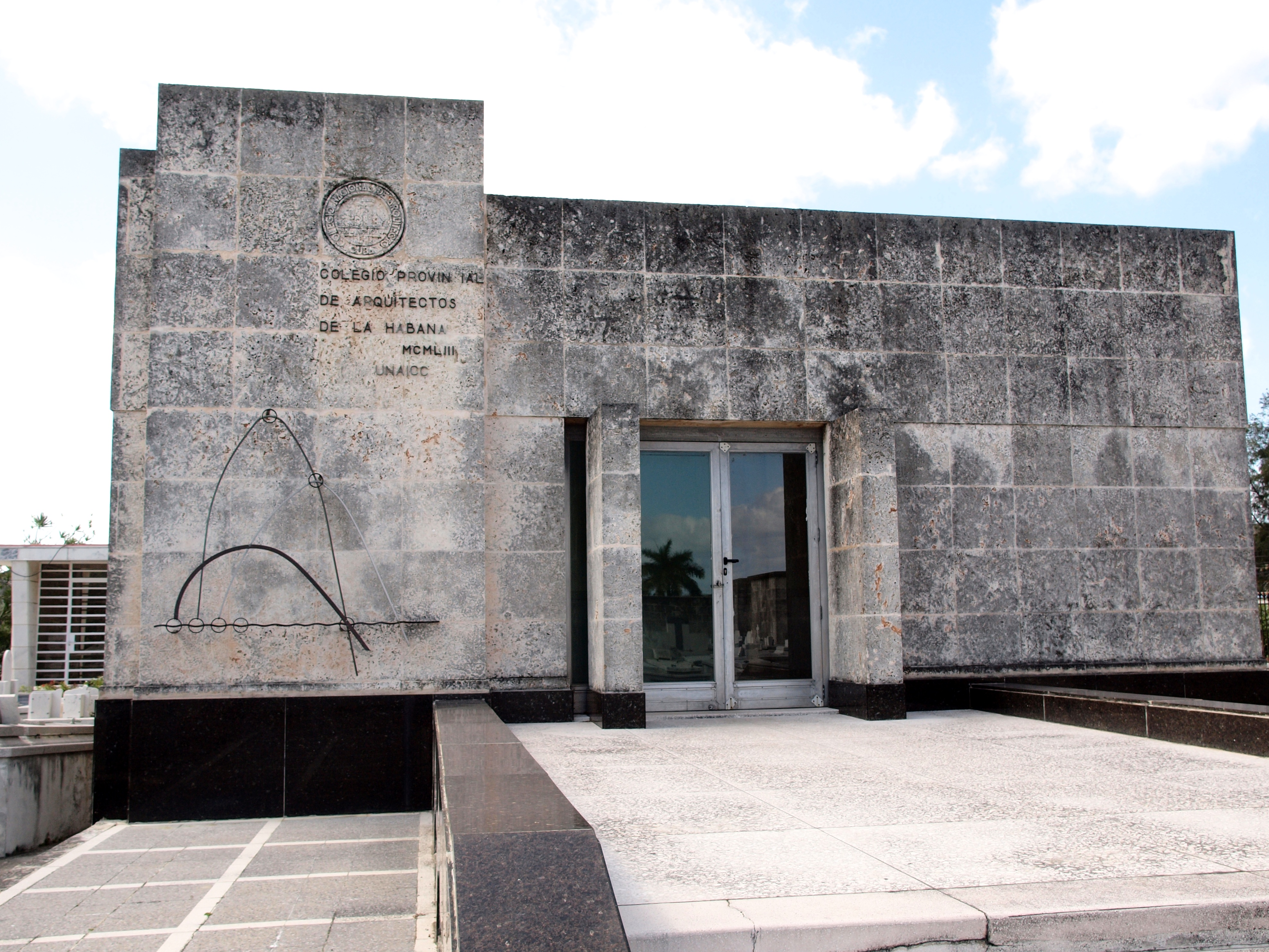

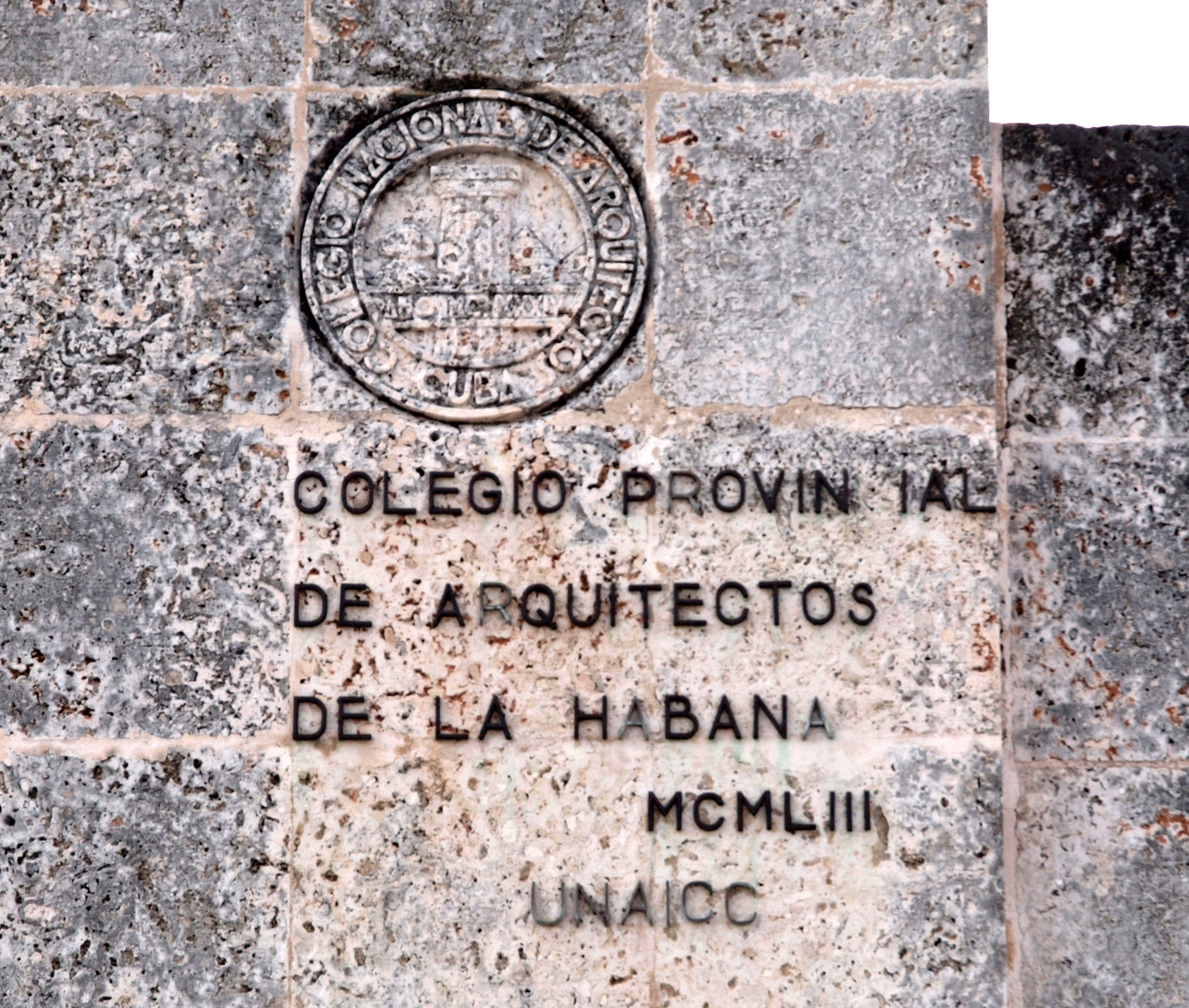

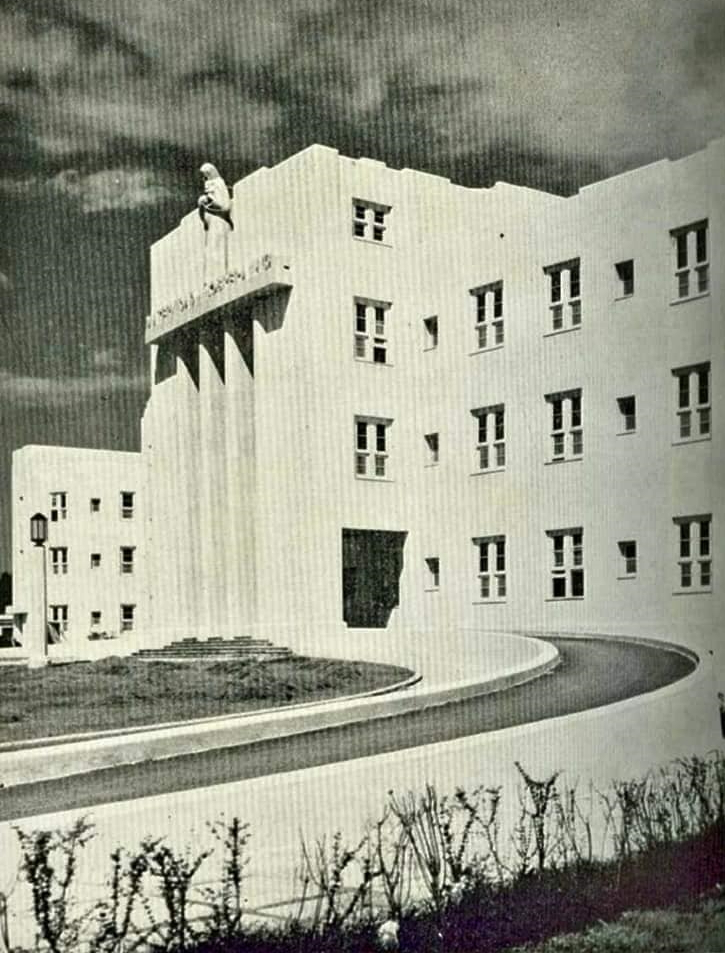
Hospital Maternidad Obrera, Havana, 1942

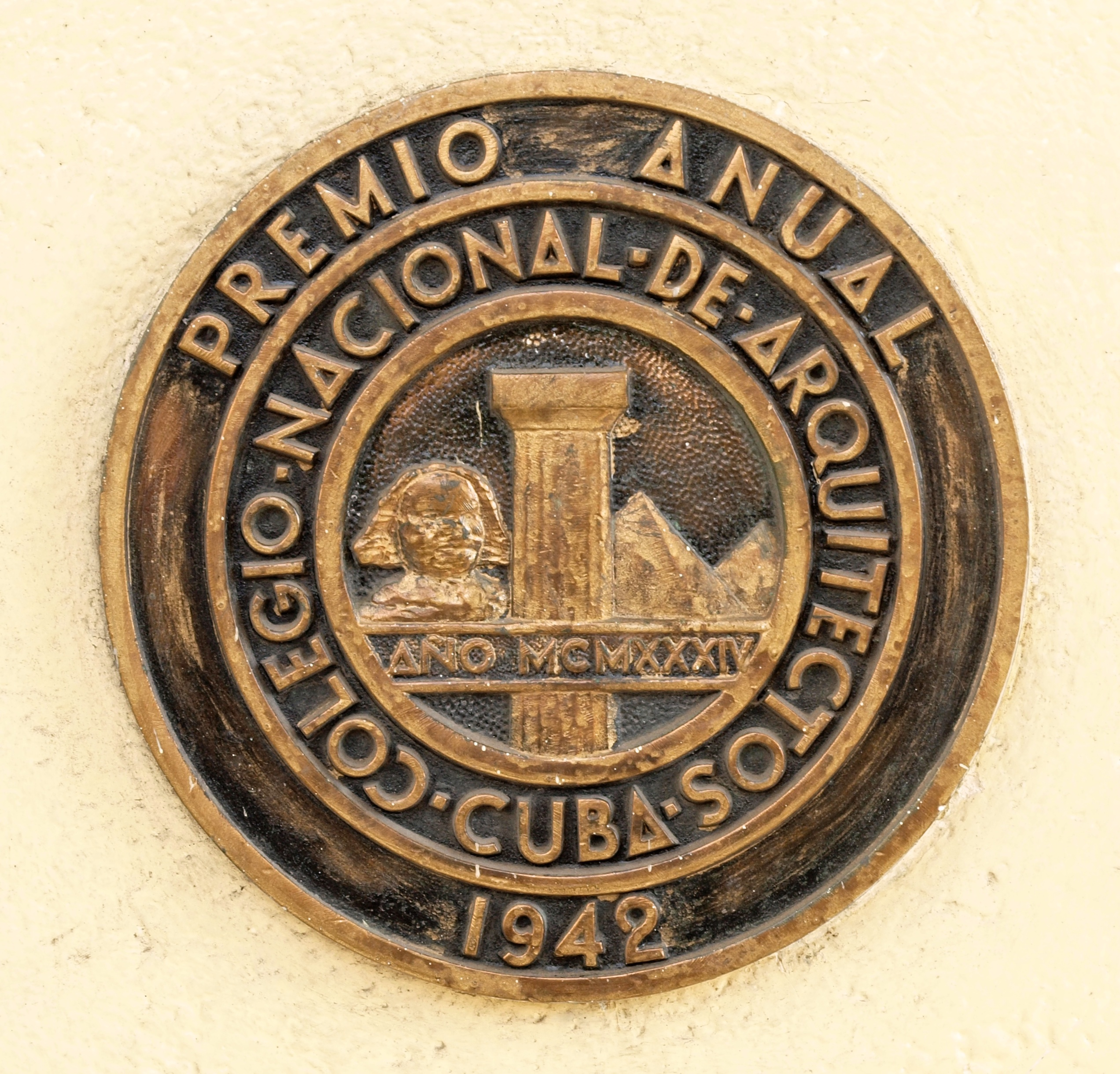
Gold Medal Award of the National College of Architects, Hospital Maternidad Obrera, Havana 1942

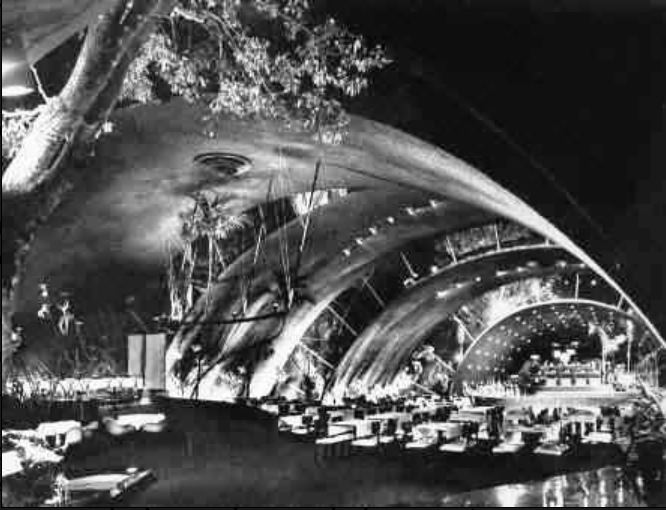
Tropicana Club

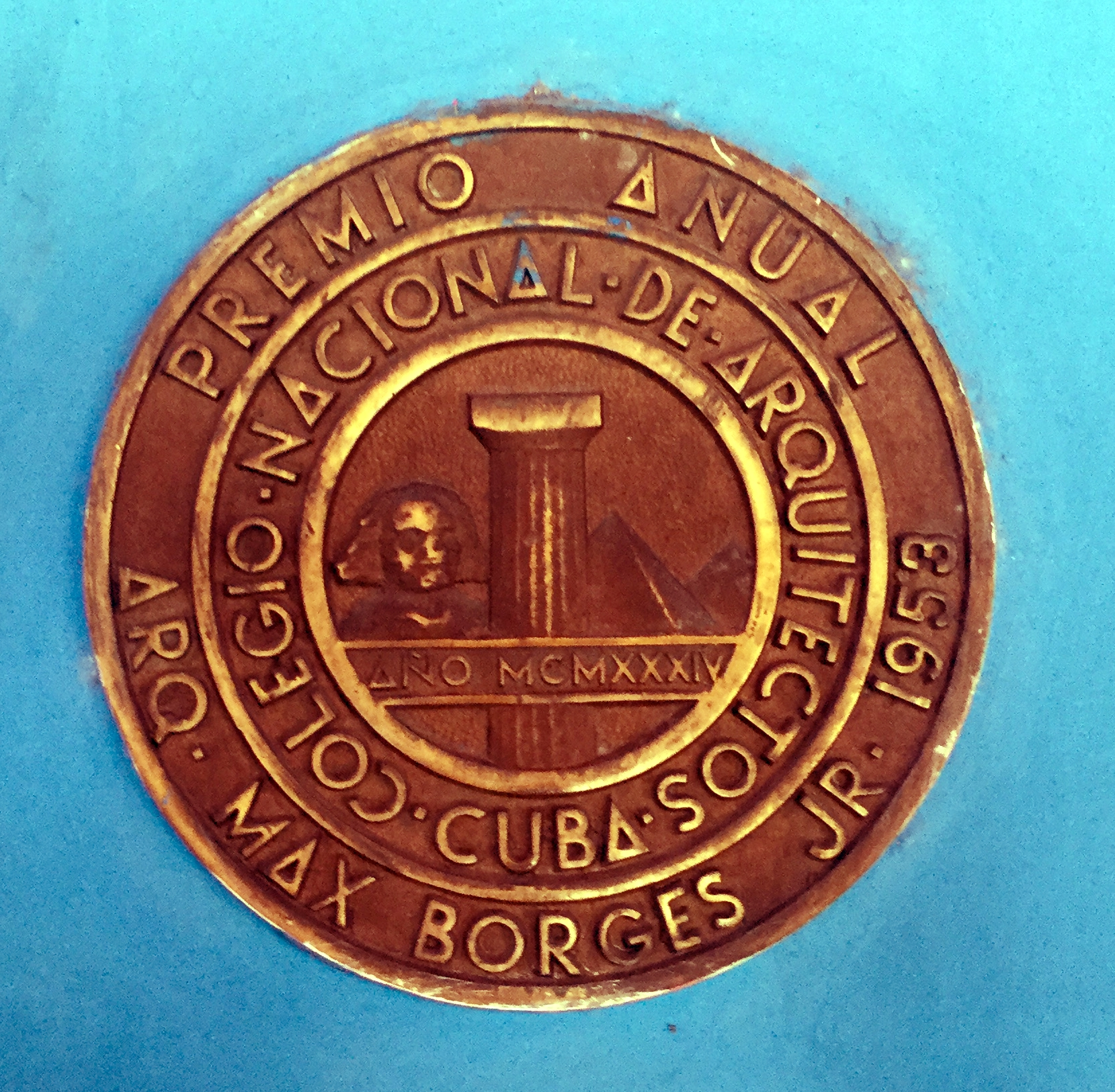
Max Borges Jr. 1953 Colegio de Arquitectos Tropicana Club

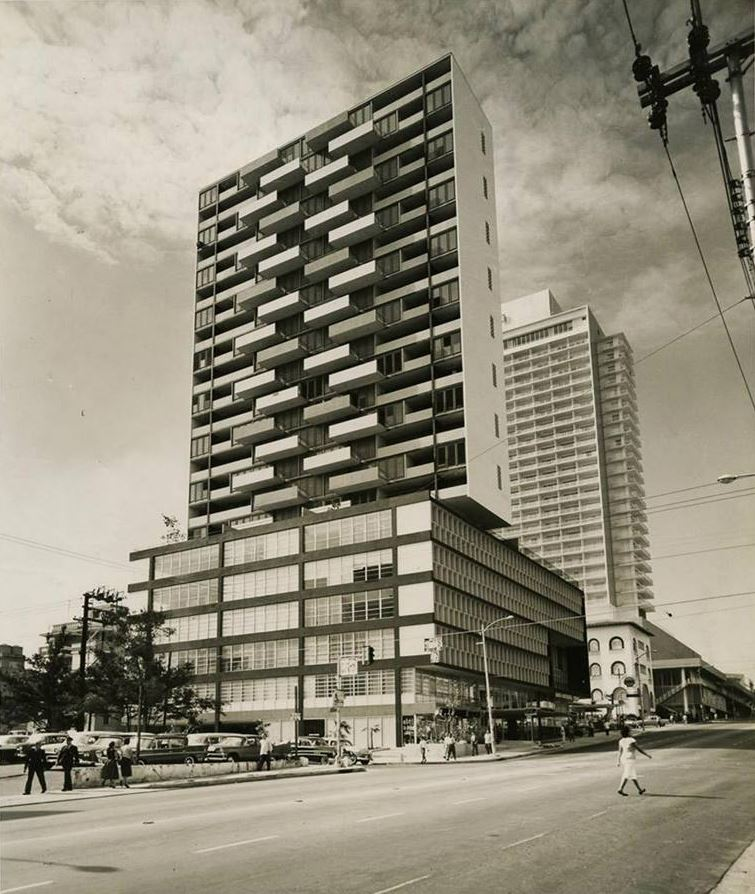
Antonio Quintana Simonettiin 1959, gold medal by the Colegio Nacional de Arquitectos de Cuba

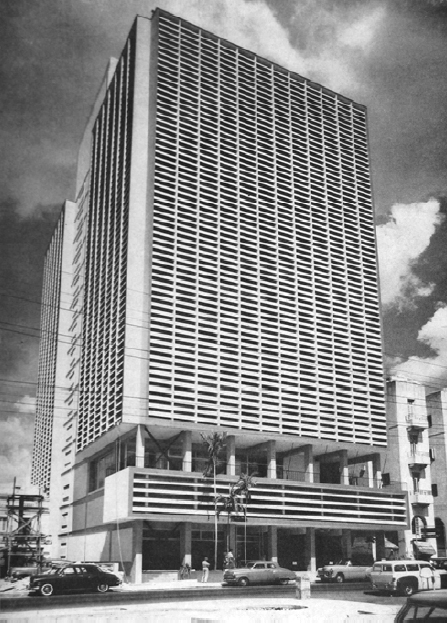
Antonio Quintana Simonetti Retiro Odontologico building, 1956 gold medal by the School of Architects in Havana.

== See also ==
- Maternidad Obrera de Marianao
- Tropicana Club
- Max Borges Jr.
- Antonio Quintana Simonetti
- Edificio del Seguro Médico, Havana
