= Frank Martínez (architect) =

Cuban architect

- Born: Francisco Martínez y Justíz; 1924; Havana, Cuba
- Education: Universidad de la Habana
- Occupation: Architect
- Children: Frank Martínez
- Design: Acuario Nacional de Cuba

Frank Martínez (b. 1924) was a Cuban-born architect and a leading figure in Cuban modernist architecture.

== Early life and education ==
Franciso Martínez y Justíz was born in 1924 in Havana, Cuba.

In the 1940s, he enrolled and studied at the School of Architecture at the University of Havana. He was among the architecture students who participated in the "Burning of the Viñolas" in 1944, where books taken from the School of Architecture's library were publicly set on fire. Nicolás Quintana and Martinez both graduated in the same class in 1951. After working together briefly on residential projects in Havana, Quintana committed himself to continuing his late father's firm Moenck & Quintana.

== Career ==
Among his contemporaries, such as Mario Romañach, Nicolás Quintana, and Ricardo Porro, Martinez started his career in the 1950s Cuban modernist generation.

The Cuban architects' early works consist of residential architecture including private houses and buildings. In 1955, a home was designed by Martínez and built for Sergio Carbó in Playa, Havana. He created a design for the National Aquarium in Miramar, a neighborhood west of Havana in 1959.

Martínez worked in an Apartment Building of Isabel and Olga Pérez Farfante before working with Wakther Gropius in the United States.

Following the Cuban revolution, he remained in Cuba and eventually emigrated to the United States. He settled in Boston in 1960, where he worked with Walter Gropius before relocating to Miami in the 1970s.
