= Antonio Quintana Simonetti =

Cuban architect

- Born: April 19, 1919; Havana, Cuba
- Died: September 21, 1993 (aged 74); Havana, Cuba
- Education: University of Havana
- Occupation: Architect
- Spouse: Matilde Ponce Copado
- Awards: Gold Medal from the Colegio Nacional de Arquitectos de Cuba
- Buildings: Building for Enriqueta Fernández, Edificio del Seguro Médico, Building del Retiro Odontológico

Antonio Luis Quintana Simonetti (April 19, 1919 – September 21, 1993) was a Cuban architect and a forerunner of Modern architecture in Havana. Quintana graduated from the University of Havana in 1944, among his works are some of the most important modernist buildings in the capital. Dissatisfied as a student with the classical canons, Antonio Quintana participated in 1944 in the so-called "Burning of Vignola" in the courtyard of the School of Architecture of the University of Havana. From this date forward, he began to study the precepts of contemporary architecture. He graduated as an architect in the same year.

== History ==
Early in his career, Quintana worked with Pedro Martínez Inclán and Mario Romañach in the Barrio Residencial Obrero de Luyanó, a modernist project that consisting of 1,500 houses, eight apartment complexes in four-story buildings, and all the complementary services of the houses: markets, schools, sports fields, and parks.

After the triumph of the Cuban Revolution, in 1959, Quintana decided to stay in Cuba and work for the revolutionary government, unlike many of his colleagues, who preferred to leave the country. He directed the Directorate of Projects of the Ministry of Construction (MICONS), between 1961 and 1969. He continued to design until 1991 when he concluded his last project, Teatro Heredia de Santiago de Cuba. He died in Havana on September 21, 1993, at the age of 74.

== Building for Enriqueta Fernández ==
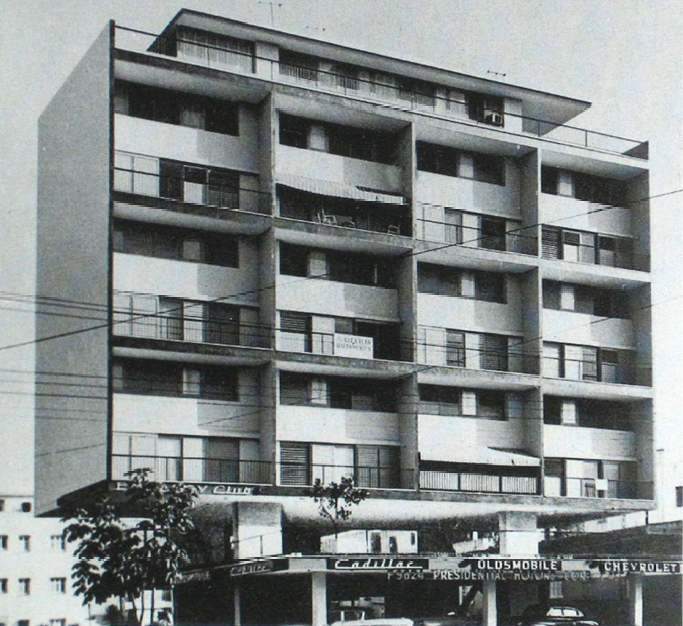
Antonio Quintana, duplex apartments. Havana (Vedado), Cuba, 1951–1953

Between 1951 and 1953 he designed, with Alberto Beale, Manuel A. Rubio y Augusto Pérez Beato, the apartment building for Enriqueta Fernández on the corners of 23 and 26 streets, in Vedado, Havana. The building constitutes the first instance in the construction of 12 two-level, duplex apartments in Cuba. Due to its structural lightness, the building caused an impact at the time.

The volume of the building consists of a block that rests on four columns that are spaced about 12m apart, and a cantilever of about 6m on each side. The stairs and the elevator are separated from the main body which connects every 2 floors. The floor of the houses is organized by modules of about 3 meters that give rise to the different rooms. The structural framework also organizes the façade, generating frames every two floors, which contain each housing unit. The enclosure is delayed giving rise to a terrace.

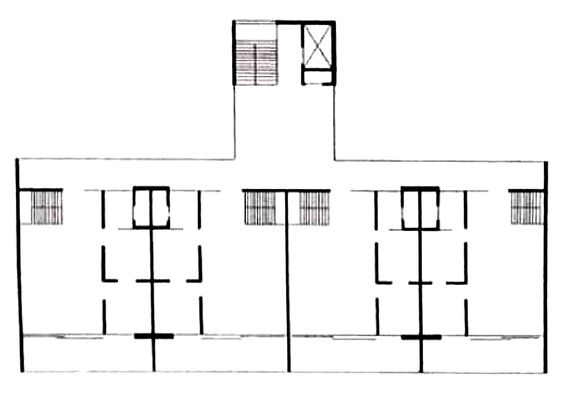
Antonio Quintana Simonetti, architect. Edificio Enriqueta Fernández building, duplex apartment, lower floor

Quintana based the building's design on an idea suggested by José Rodríguez Feo, who later lived in the penthouse; he saw "the building as hanging from a cloud", floating, or almost without touching the ground, with the aim of integrating the public and private spaces, making the corner "disappear", the place that would be like a square and used for exhibitions. It was a very novel structure for its time, supported by only four columns and the building seems to levitate six meters on the sides, as well as the staircase and the elevator seem separated from it and connecting every two floors. In 1955, economic needs and the search for greater profitability led the ground floor to be occupied by a car dealer, this intervention added new partitions but the original idea and transparency continued to be present, in later years a new cafeteria was added on the ground floor and a restaurant on the mezzanine, nullifying the original conception of the project and making it impossible to distinguish the differentiation of volumes.

== Building del Retiro Odontológico ==
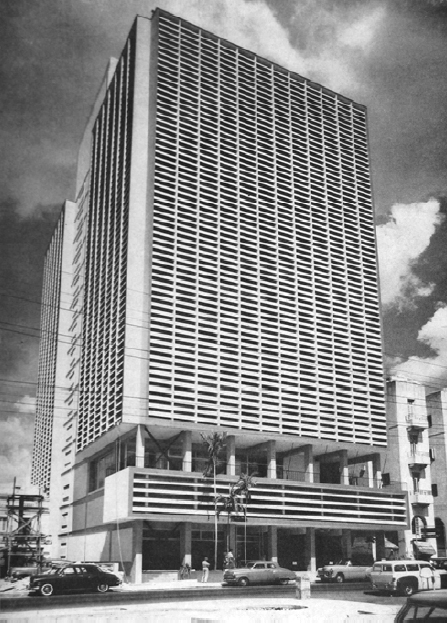
Antonio Quintana Retiro Odontologico building

This building is located on Calle L between 21 and 23, the construction of this building led to the Gold Medal award in 1956. This building has two basement levels designed for parking. These apartments are currently unused. It has a cafeteria with a capacity for 200 people and direct access to the street. It has a theater room that, because it is very deteriorated, does not provide functions. On the first two floors are the Stomatological College and the offices of the dental offices. This building was awarded a gold medal in 1956 by the Colegio Nacional de Arquitectos de Cuba. Currently, the building houses the Faculty of Economics of the University of Havana, the Talía Theatre, and the L Art Gallery (ground floor).

== Edificio del Seguro Médico, Havana ==
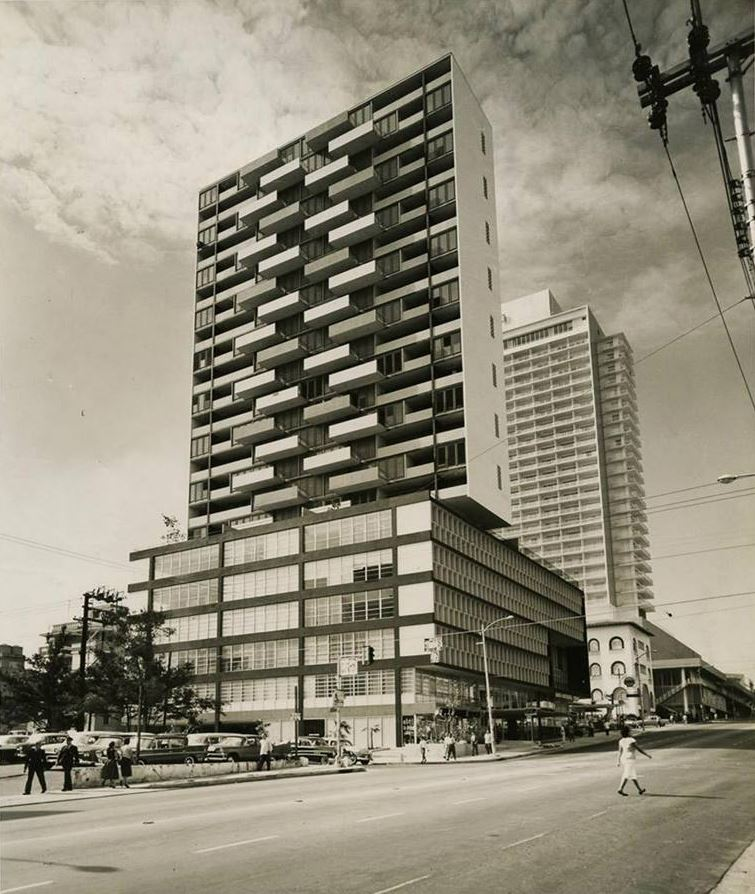
Edificio del Seguro Médico Building

The Edificio del Seguro Médico Building, located on 23rd street at N corner, is considered an important commercial architectural work of the 1950s in the city of Havana. It was initially built as a residential building and the headquarters of the Medical Insurance. Currently, the Latin Press Agency and the Ministry of Public Health are based there. It has 2 basement levels for parking. From the 4th floor, there are 3 apartments per floor.

=== 1955 competition ===
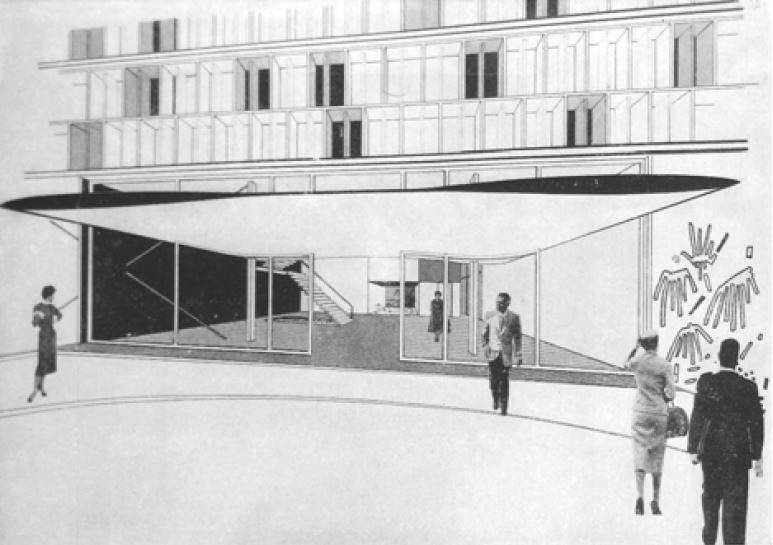
Commercial building entrance on La Rampa. Drawing by Quintana.

The project arose as a result of a public architectural competition held in 1955 for the new headquarters of the Cuban Colegio de Médicos (National Medical Association) and the offices of the Medical Insurance Company. Given the high cost of the site, the complexity of the initial project was increased by the need to add rental income from apartments that would help to make the building profitable. Antonio Quintana's proposal was the winner since it managed to solve the complexity of the program with two volumes: a five-story box containing administrative offices, an auditorium, and lobbies, and an eighteen-story modernist slab with its own separate entrance lobby. Quintana established a visual dialogue between the two geometries and generated new guidelines for the new emerging modernist, mixed-use typologies. in the city.

The Seguro Medico was a private company, they were the landlord and owner of the residential tower and thus subject to the new property redistribution instituted by the Castro government. Early in the new revolutionary government, guided by the principals that: 1. housing is a right, not a commodity, 2. housing should be equitable, and 3. the government is the primary decision-maker, "Fidel Castro sought to release the grip landlords held on Cuban properties with a 1960 urban-reform law that eliminated multiple ownership, gave renters a chance to buy their homes at low cost and made the state responsible for providing housing." Thus, all private property was abolished and the government forcefully became the new owner of the Seguro Medico building.

=== Program ===
The first mixed-use building in Havana was the Radiocentro CMQ Building, also on La Rampa (Calle 23). The modernist Edificio del Seguro Médico is one of the earliest mixed-use buildings (commercial/residential) in Havana. Similar to the Lever House in Manhattan, Simonetti set up a relationship of two volumes of dissimilar proportion: a box at the lower level containing the Seguro Médico offices, and an eighteen-story residential block. Similar to the FOCSA Building's podium used only for recreation, the residences are located over the roof of the Seguro Medico offices; a large plane made into a children's playground (garden) as shown in the Quintana sketch-drawing for that area.

Because the building must accommodate a dual program, there is a total separation by way of two scales, two structural modules, and two entrances on two different streets. (Note: Mariano Rodriguez won, together with Wifredo Lam, the competition for the realization of two murals. Mariano's mural is in ceramic and titled Boomerang. His work Gallo Amarillo obtained a merit award of $500.00 at the VIII National Painting and Sculpture Hall and went to the collection of the National Museum.)

== Architecture ==
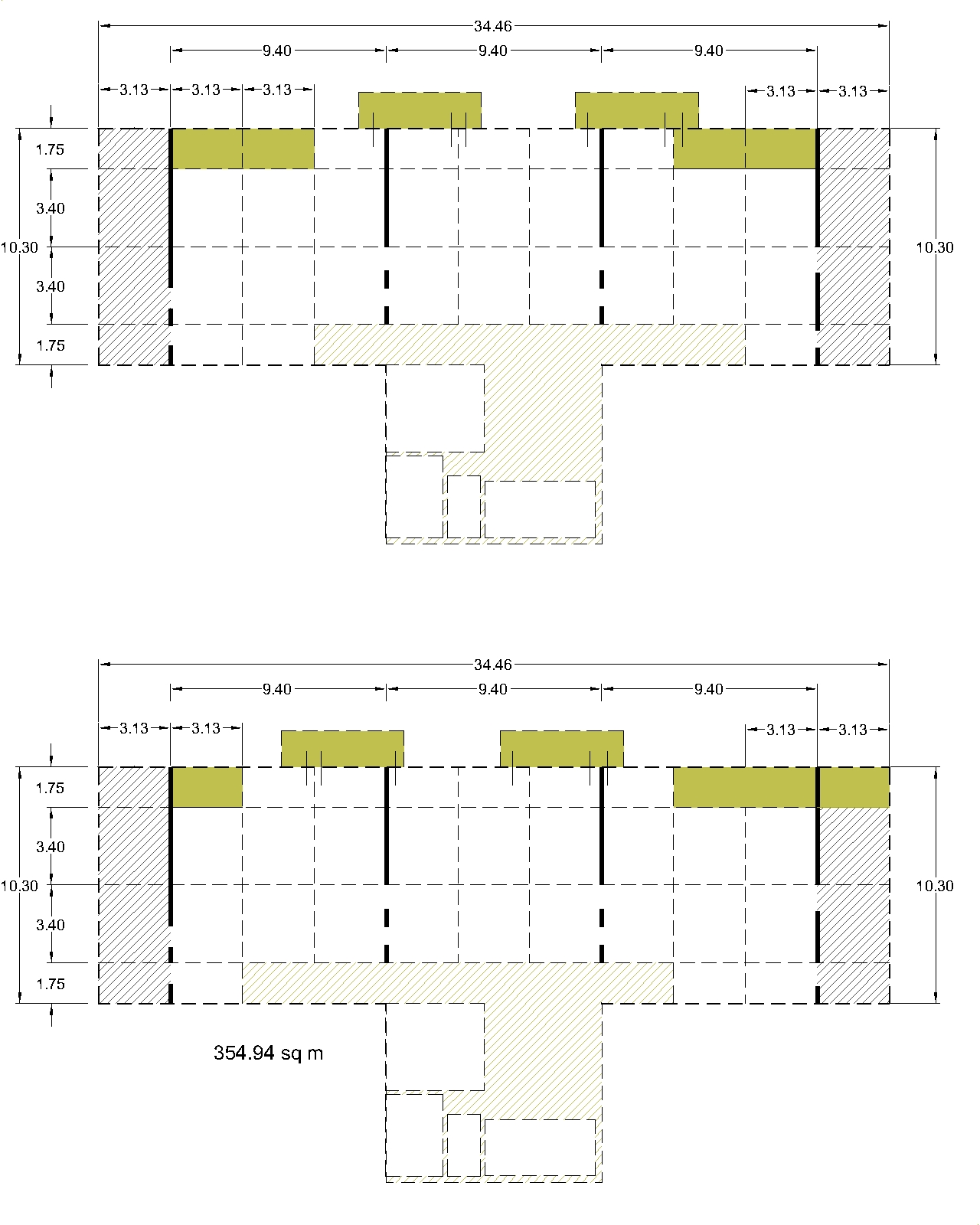
Structural Plan. Residential block

=== Residential module ===
The residential block has an architectural module of 3.13 metres (10.3 ft) by 3.40 metres (11.2 ft). Three 3.13 metres (10.3 ft) modules are expressed on the north elevation of the office block by the 9.40-meter dimension of the bearing walls. The outboard balconies are each of a different color and alternate position on every floor. The lower volume occupied today by the Ministry of Public Health. (Note: Robert Venturi in the ISI Building at 3501 Market Street near the Penn campus designed a flush facade (on the north-east side of the building) similar to the Edificio del Seguro Médico so that there is a modernist reading, no shadows from the window frames register on the facade.) The 3.40 metres (11.2 ft) width of the rooms is further subdivided into three sections of 1.13 metres (3 ft 8 in) and this module determines the width of doors, windows, and passages between rooms within the apartment. The wooden windows have two sets of nine movable slats that can be independently controlled to modulate the natural light in the room, they can be completely closed to make the room totally dark, even in bright days. The pattern of the windows and door and the bearing walls (9.40 meters apart) are expressed on the Calle N elevation.

=== Balconies, walls and floors ===
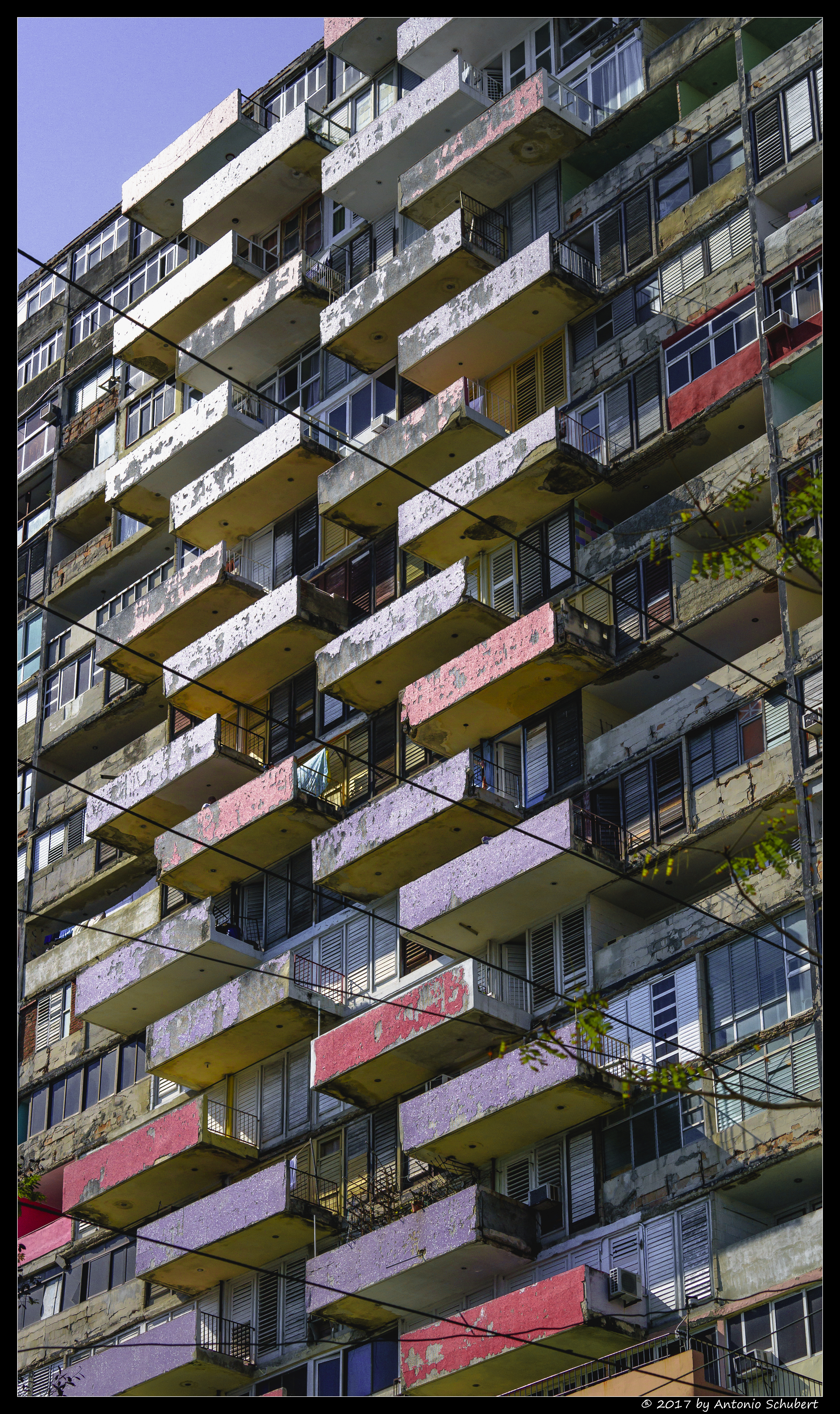
Balconies in their present state of disrepair.

The balconies have a six-inch terrazzo baseboard and two incandescent lights located in the ceiling of the balcony above. The front railing of the outboard balconies are the upturned concrete floor slab, the two pre-fab side railings are metal. Originally the floors in the residential tower were of black terrazzo.

There are four structural walls of poured in place reinforced concrete. The two center walls are the shear panels of the tower. The height of the apartment ceiling is eleven concrete blocks high plus a terrazzo base (2,352 millimetres (92.6 in)). They divide the apartments and rooms and are unpainted, set in common, gray mortar, the wall sits on top of a black 152 millimetres (6.0 in) terrazzo baseboard that matches the floors. Several of the doors in the apartment as the bathroom doors, for instance, have fixed louvers between the space from the top of the door to the ceiling, some of the doors have a 320 millimetres (13 in) fixed panel of glass over them. In some of the bathrooms, the terrazzo floor is raised by a step.

In both sides of the rear elevation on each floor, there is a 12.65-meter long wall that is subdivided down the center it is divided horizontally into three parts: 1-Two prefab concrete panels of 6.32 m or 9.48 m in length depending on the layout of the floor. 2- Located under the kitchen cabinets, a strip window of equal length and in the middle of the two concrete panels. The window has wooden "persianas" (venetian blinds) that were widely used in modern and traditional residential buildings in Havana such as the FOCSA Building and the López Serrano Building. The other wall is the exterior wall of the public corridor, made of floor to ceiling concrete blocks and set in such a way that allows for 8" X 8" openings throughout so that the exterior wall of the semi-public corridor is partially open to the elements. The concrete block wall is either 6.32 or 3.17 meters long and alternates with the plank wall in an abstract pattern.

The wall enclosing the vestibule in front of the elevators is made of an aluminum frame for glass panel inserts with operable windows.

=== Ventilation and light ===
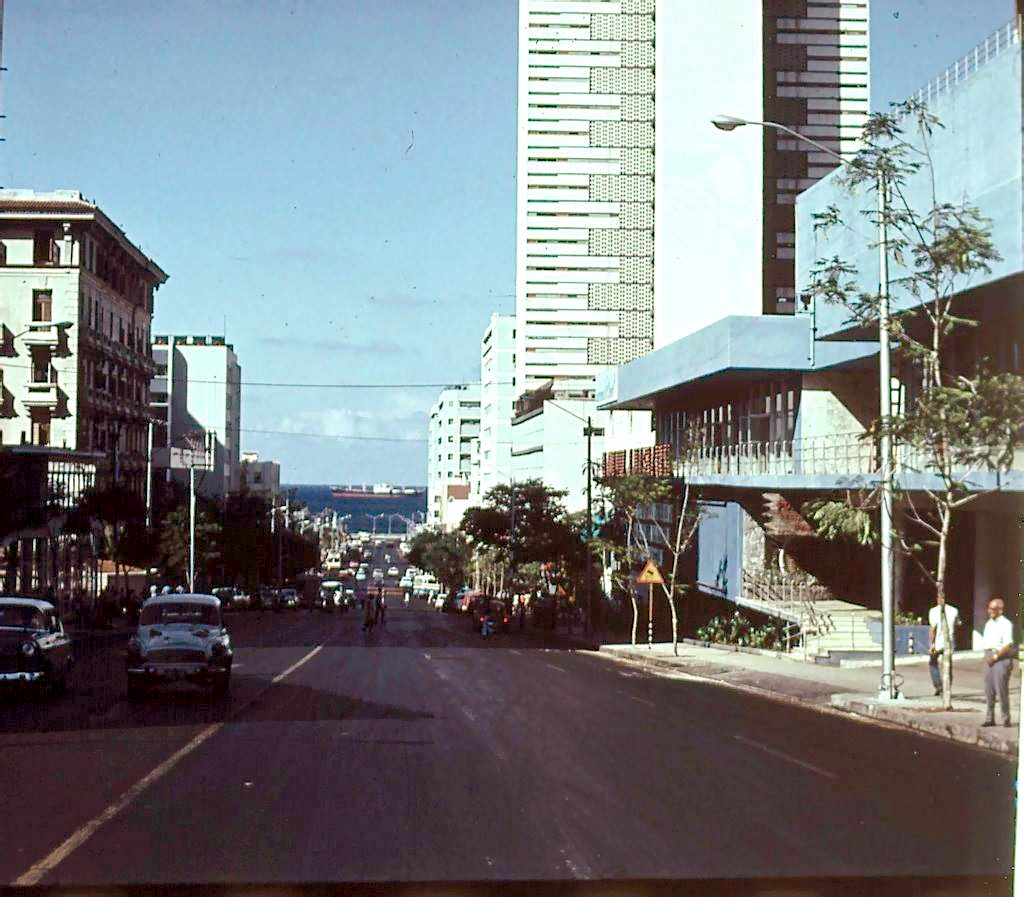
Edificio del Seguro Médico. South wall, rear elevation from La Rampa

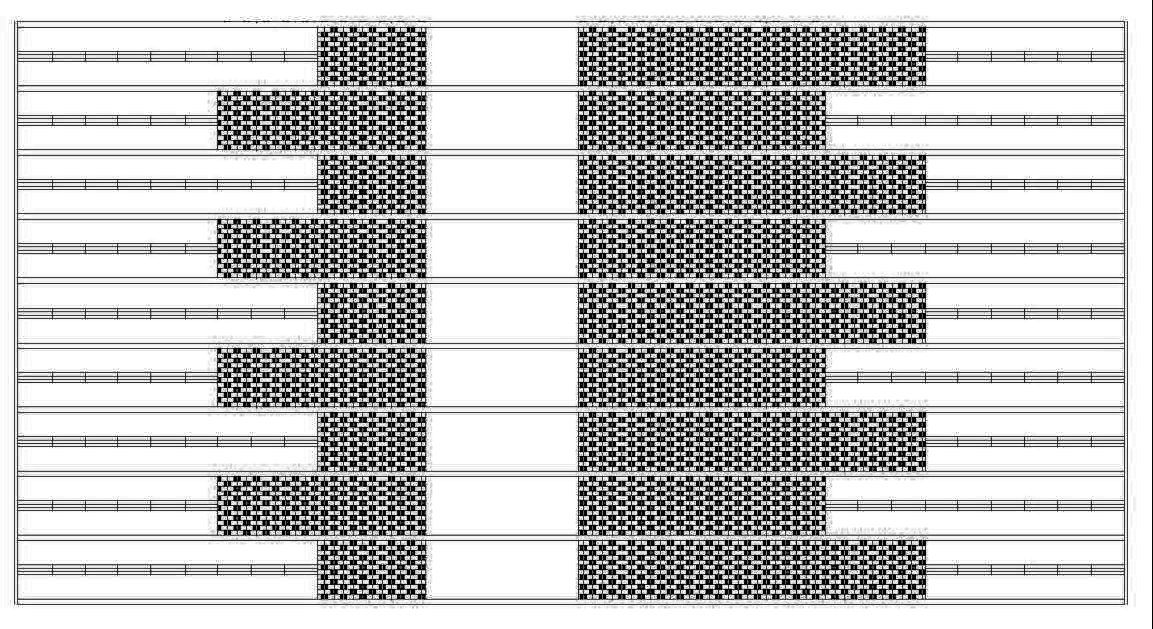
Edificio del Seguro Médico_wall detail, Havana

The north wall is designed to regulate the view, breezes from the north and the natural light. The entire wall is subdivided according to the 3.13 metres (10.3 ft) module and it is composed of louvered doors and windows that can be made to open completely so that the wall is de-materialized, or, its opposite, be made to change its character to the point where no air or light can enter the rooms. On the rear elevation, two different wall surface designs form an abstract pattern. One, accommodates a horizontal operable window in the middle of the wall, (similar to the FOCSA Building), which is made up of two prefab concrete slabs. The other design makes the wall partially porous by the placement of the cmu to allow for views, natural light and ventilation.

=== Murals ===
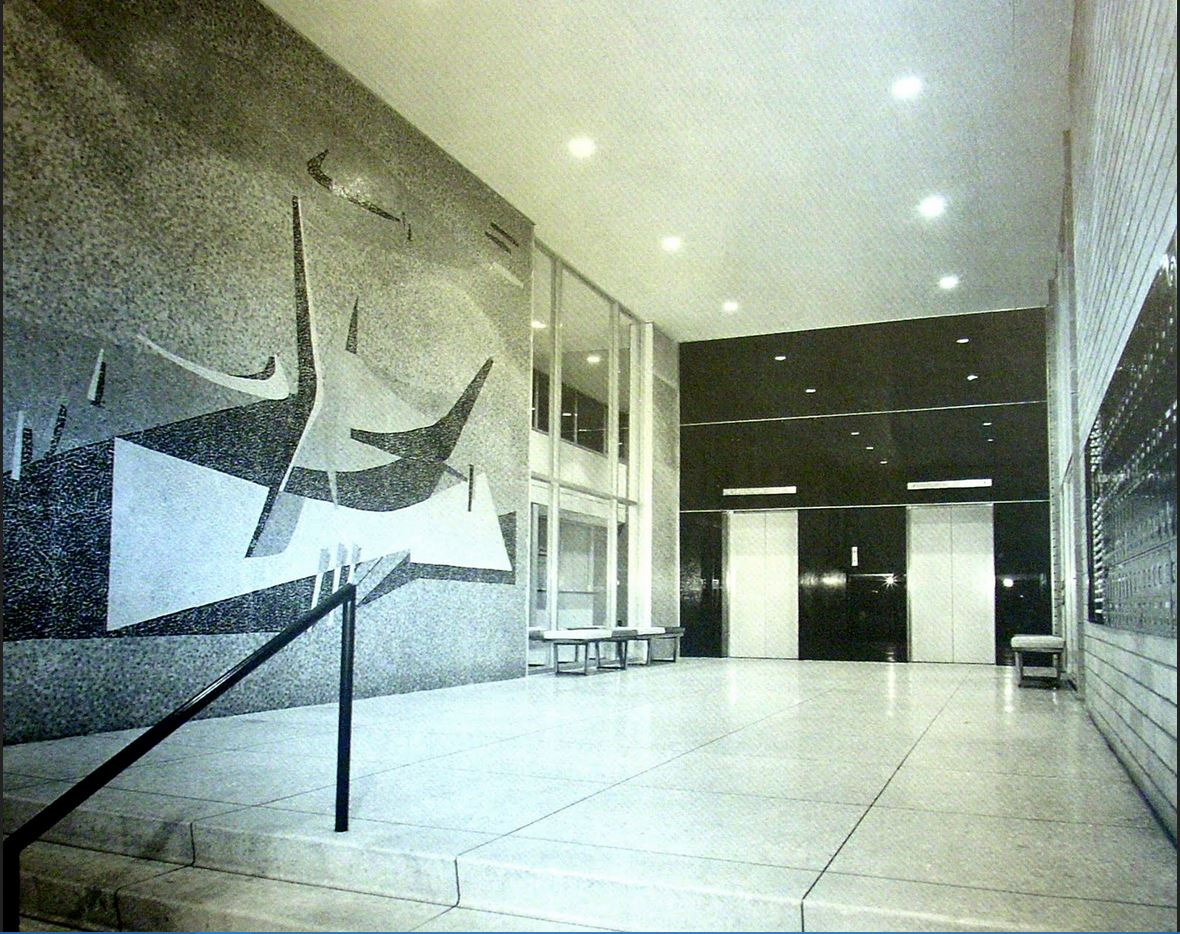
Residential lobby entrance from Calle N, mural by Mariano Rodriguez

The building has two murals, one a black and white tesserae mural by Wifredo Lam entitled Abstracción which is located on the main entrance-commercial vestibule on Calle La Rampa; the other is in the residential lobby on Calle N and titled Boomerang, by Mariano Rodriguez.

=== Prize ===
- 1956 gold medal by the School of Architects in Havana, Retiro Odontologico building, Antonio Quintana Simonetti (1919–1943), Architect.
- 1959, Edificio del Seguro Médico, Havana, Antonio Quintana Simonetti (1919–1943), Architect.

== Rafael Salas apartment building ==
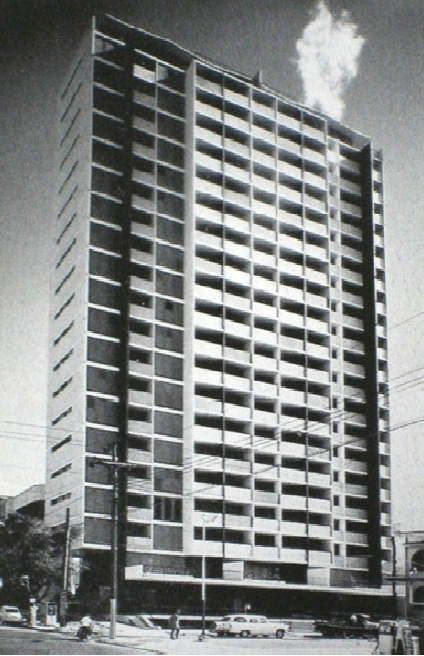
Antonio Quintana Apartamentos Rafael Salas, Havana, Cuba

This was built on the corner of 25 facing G street. It was built at the same time as the Medical Insurance but it does not have a basement. It was designed to appear as if the structure was floating, but when years later the plant was closed with solid partitions and wood, it lost that effect. It has 18 floors and is currently under repair.

== Publication ==
At the national level, Quintana received recognition from the main specialized publications of the time: Arquitectura, Espacio, Álbum de Cuba; at the same time, his work was made known internationally through the publication Latin American Architecture since 1945, published by the Museum of Modern Art in New York, and the Exhibition of Modern Cuban Architecture held in the same city by the Architectural League of New York. In 1959 he received the Gold Medal award from the National College of Architects for the Best Designer of Commercial Projects.

== Gallery ==
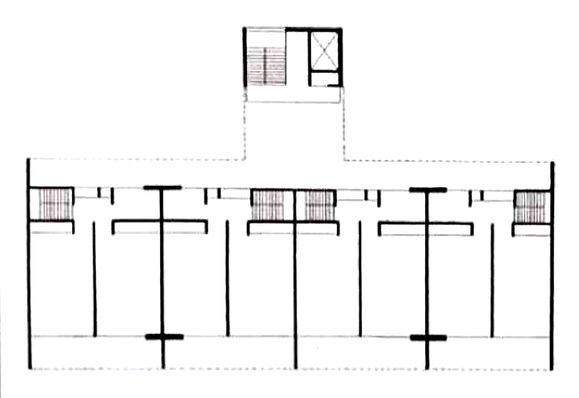
Antonio Quintana Simonetti, architect. Edificio Enriqueta Fernández building, duplex apartment, upper floor

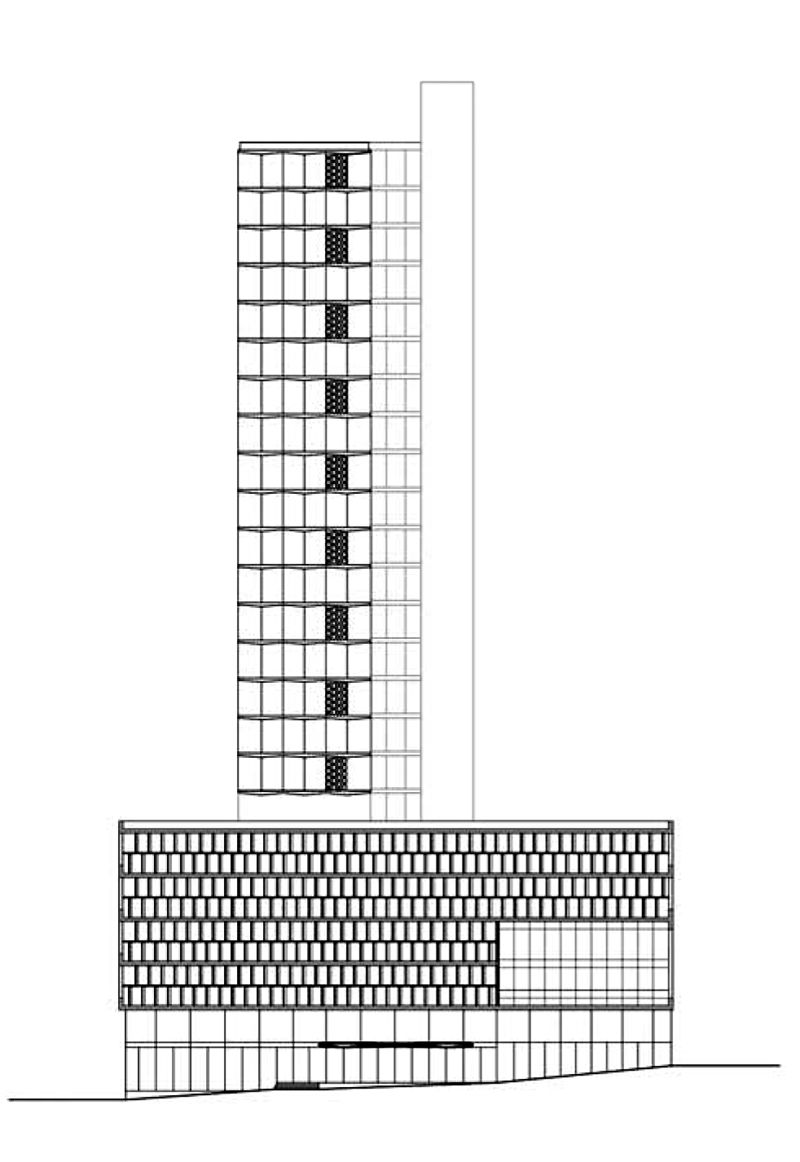
Edificio del Seguro Médico, La Rampa elevation.

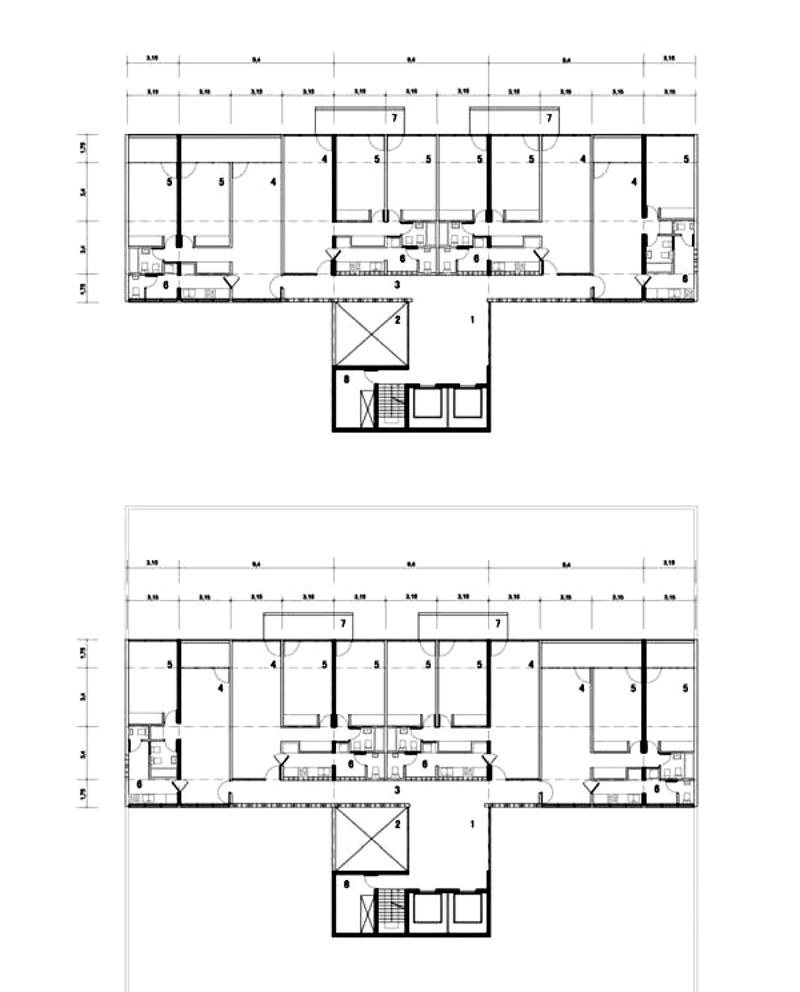
Edificio del Seguro Médico. Residential Block Plan.

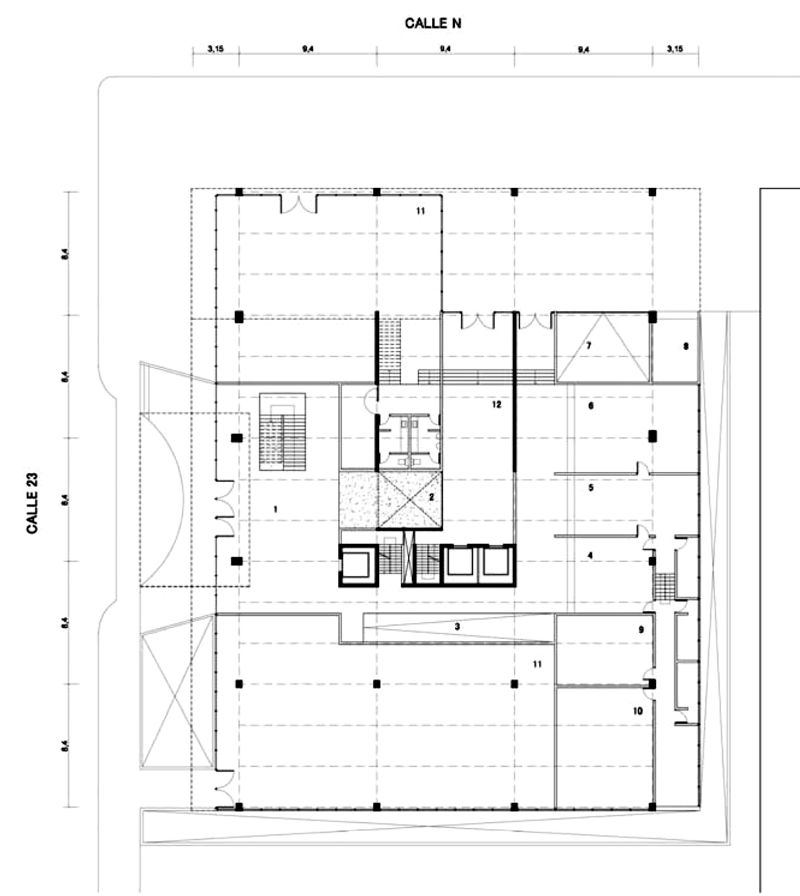
Ground floor plan.

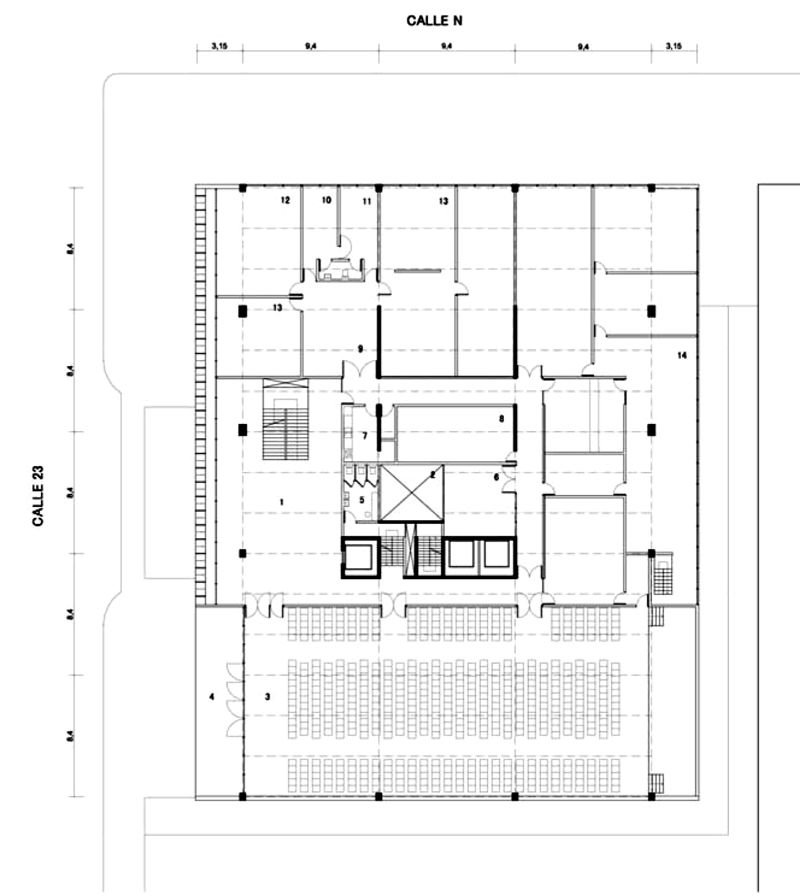
Second-floor plan.

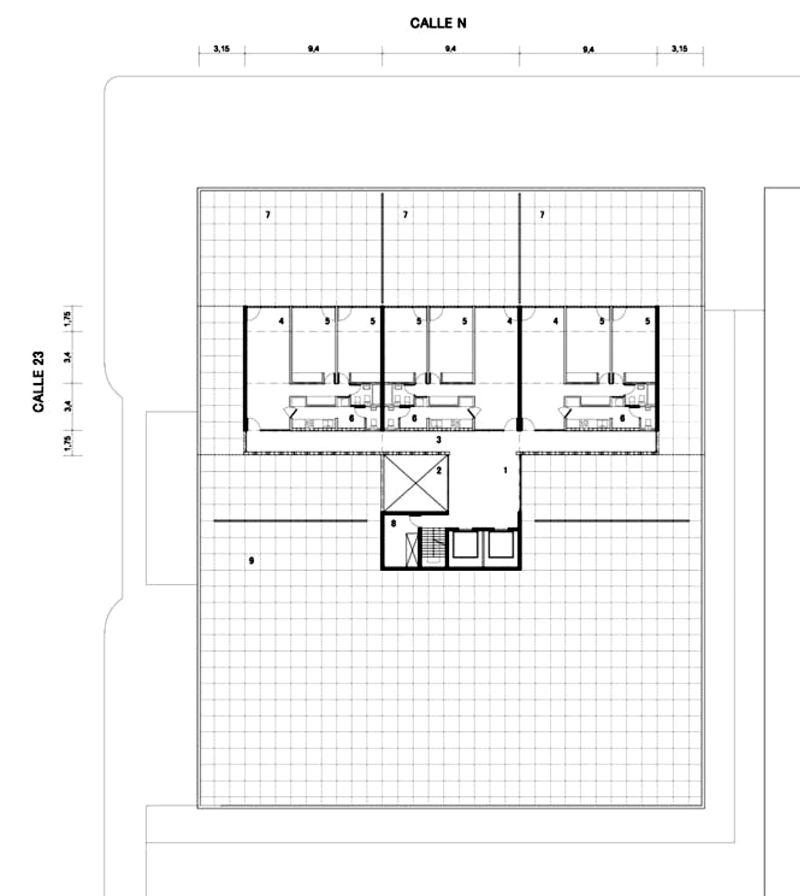
Sixth-floor plan.

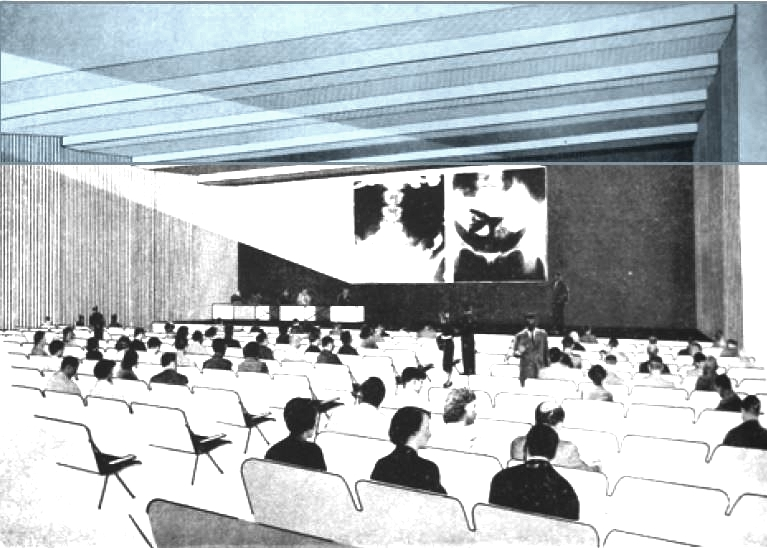
Auditorium. Drawing by Quintana.

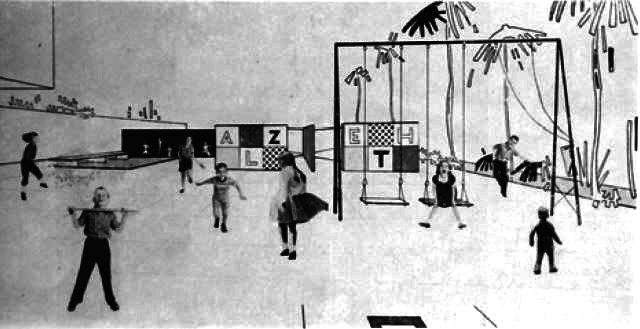
Garden_Sixth Floor. Drawing by Quintana.

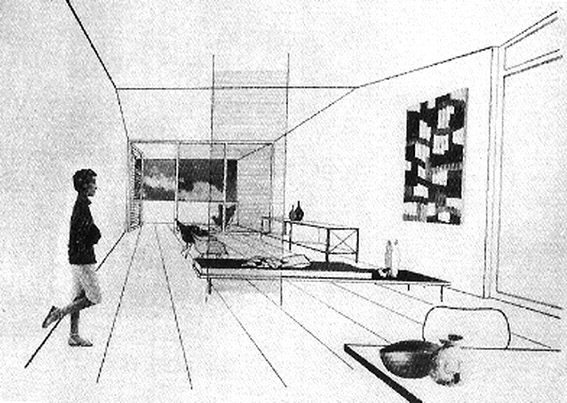
Drawing by Antonio Quintana.

== See also ==
- Edificio del Seguro Médico, Havana
- FOCSA Building
- Rosita De Hornedo
- López Serrano Building
