= Paul Lester Wiener =

- Born: 1895; Leipzig, German Empire
- Died: 1967 (aged 71–72)
- Occupation: Architect
- Spouse: Alma Morgenthau Wertheim

Paul Lester Wiener (1895–1967) was an American architect and urban planner.

== Education ==
He was educated in the Royal Academy of Berlin with post graduate study in Vienna and Paris. He came to the United States in 1913 and became a citizen in 1919. He returned to Europe for further study and work until 1927. In 1934, he designed the Contempora House and it was listed on the National Register of Historic Places in 2009.

== Notable projects ==
Paul Lester Wiener collaborated with Le Corbusier. Wiener and Sert originated a master plan for the city of Havana, Bogotá and several other city units in Colombia which were based on the principles of planning for expected population and organizing the growth of the city in an efficient manner, as well as reorganizing existing features to provide planned living and recreational space for residents with an eye to preventing the undesirable effects of random growth such as slum housing and inequitable distribution of land, etc.

In 1958, Wiener accepted his most significant commission in the United States: to plan a neighborhood development in the Washington Square area of New York City, providing several thousand housing units within a six-block area. Combining his concepts of clean basic lines a functional form with bold color, he designed a series of high rise apartments which incorporated outdoor patio style living with the convenience of a central urban location and exciting visual environment.

== Personal life ==
In 1935, he married Alma Morgenthau Wertheim, former wife of Maurice Wertheim and daughter of Henry Morgenthau Sr.
