= Floridita =

Restaurant & bar in Havana, Cuba

Coordinates: 23.137317°N 82.357324°W

El Floridita
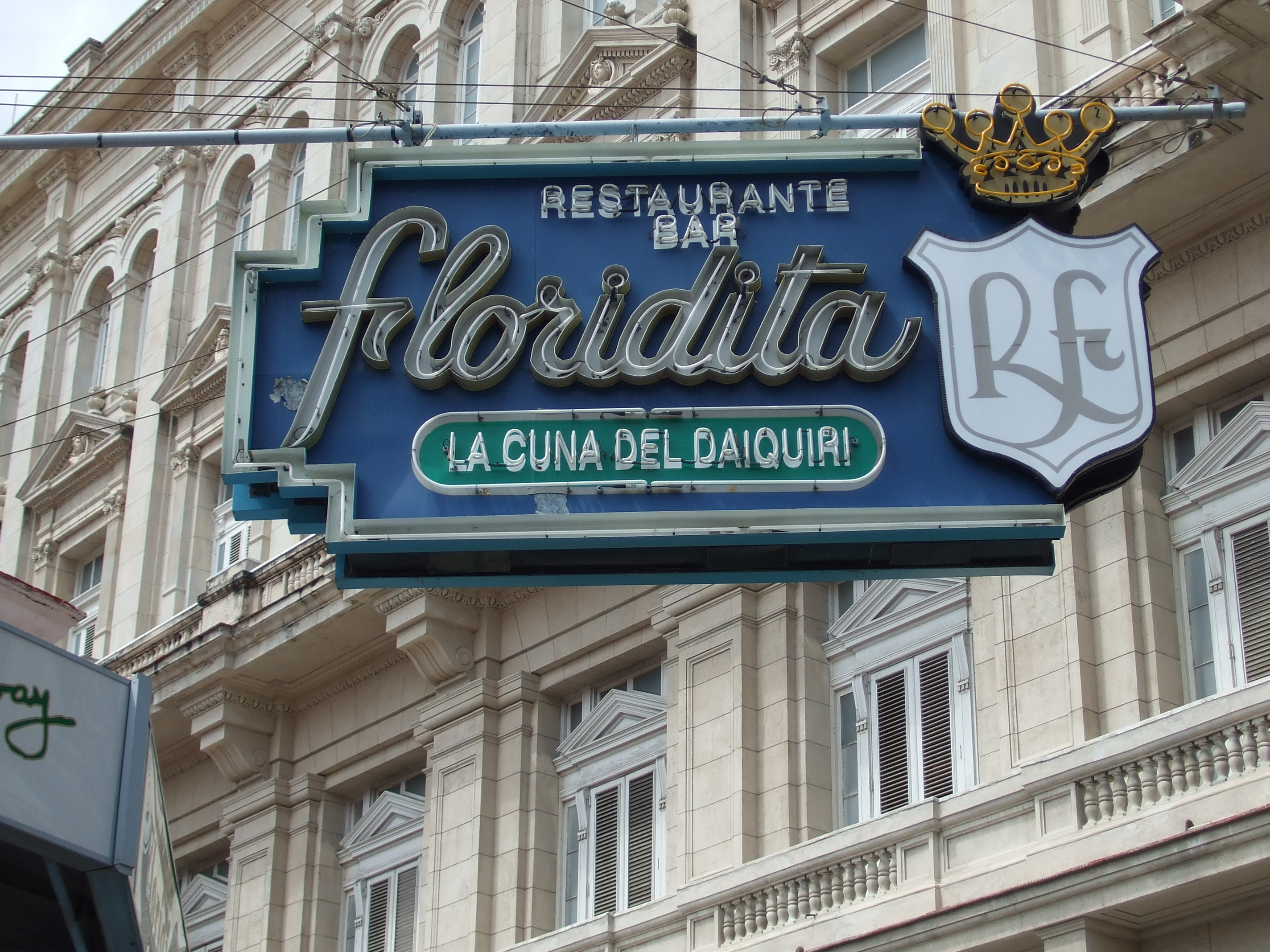
- Interactive map of the El Floridita area
- Former names: La Piña de Plata

General information
- Type: Commercial
- Architectural style: Neo classical
- Location: Obispo and Monserrate streets, 557 Obispo, Ciudad de La Habana, Cuba
- Inaugurated: 1817
- Owner: Constantino Ribalaigua Vert

Height
- Architectural: 6m
- Tip: 9m
- Antenna spire: 10m
- Roof: 8m

Technical details
- Structural system: Wood
- Material: Masonry
- Floor count: Two

Design and construction
- Known for: daiquiri

Floridita (Spanish pronunciation: [floɾiˈðita]) or El Floridita is a historic fish restaurant and cocktail bar in the older part of Havana (La Habana Vieja), Cuba. It lies at the end of Calle Obispo (Bishop Street), across Monserrate Street from the National Museum of Fine Arts of Havana (Museo Nacional de Bellas Artes de La Habana). The establishment is famous for its daiquiris and for having been one of the favourite hangouts of Ernest Hemingway in Havana. The bar now boasts a life size bronze statue of Ernest Hemingway positioned in his favourite spot at the end of the bar. On a small plaque hanging in El Floridita, hangs Hemingway's signed quote: "My mojito in the Bodeguita del Medio and my daiquiri in the Floridita".

== History ==
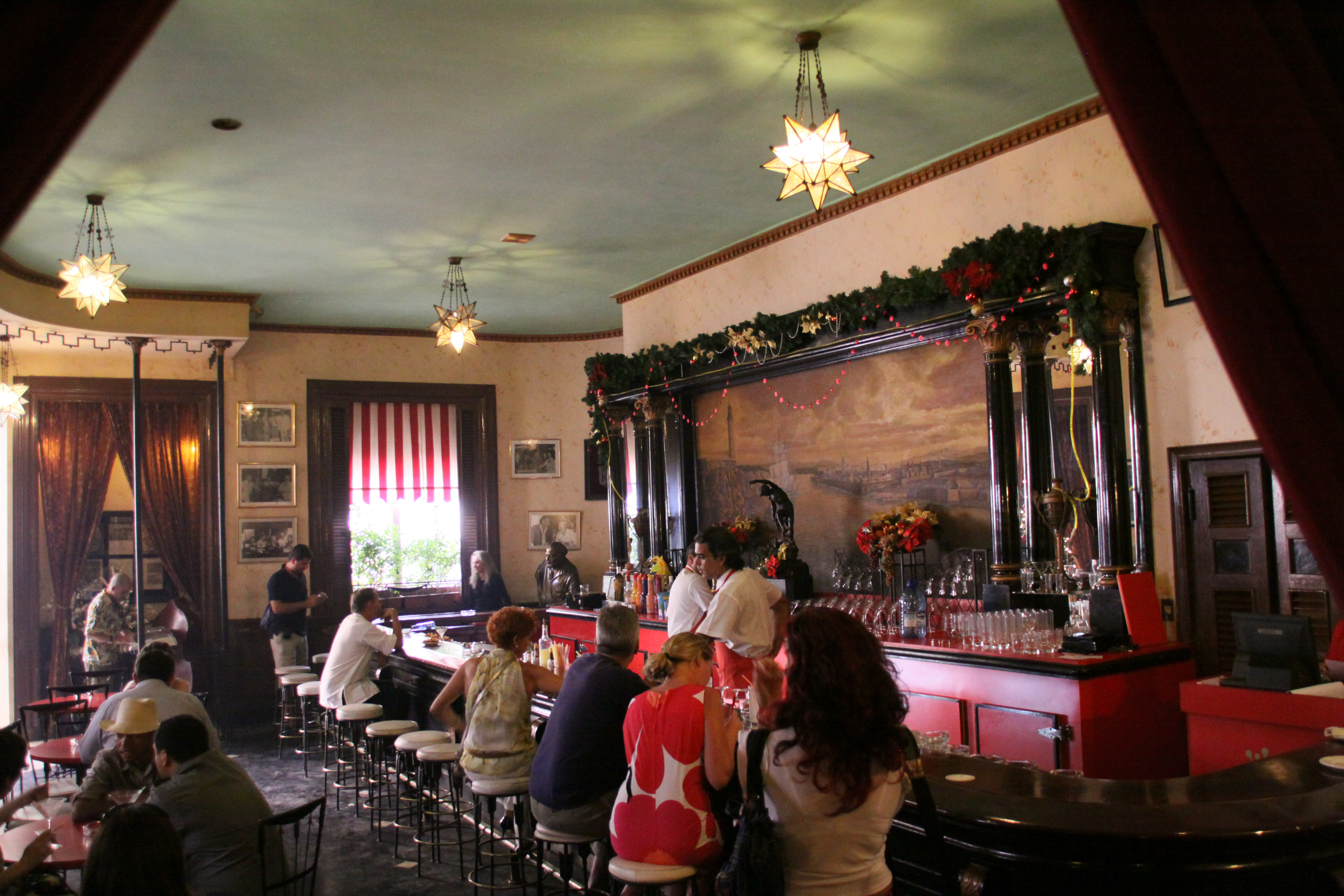
El Floridita bar. The bar "patron" at the far left of the bar, below the wall-mounted photo, is a life-sized bronze statue of Ernest Hemingway

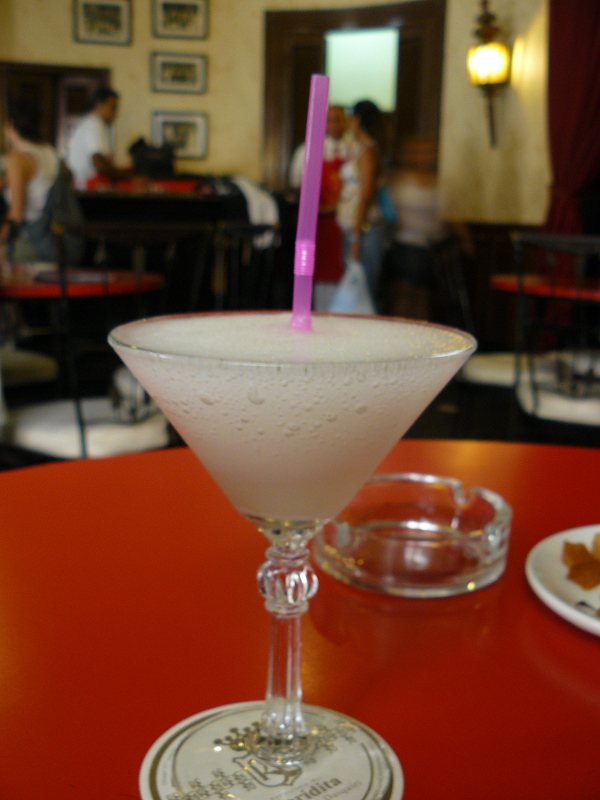
The origin of Daiquiri was highly linked with the Floridita bar.

The bar opened in 1817 with the name "La Piña de Plata" (English: The Silver Pineapple) in the place it still occupies, on the corner of Obispo and Monserrate streets. Almost 100 years later, the large number of North American tourists persuaded the owner to change the name to "El Florida".

In 1914, the Catalan immigrant Constantino Ribalaigua Vert started working in the bar as cantinero (bartender). Constantino, nicknamed Constante, became the owner in 1918. Constante is credited for inventing the frozen daiquiri in the early 1930s, a drink that became linked to the fame of the place, whose motto is now "la cuna del daiquiri" (the cradle of the daiquiri). The bar became a school of highly skilled cantineros (bartenders) specialised in cocktails prepared with fresh fruit juices and rum, whose traditions are still preserved by the disciples of Constante.

The writer Ernest Hemingway frequented the bar, which is at the end of Calle Obispo, a short walk from the Hotel Ambos Mundos where he maintained a room from 1932–1939. Hemingway's children also noted that in the early 1940s Hemingway and his wife "Mary" (Martha Gellhorn) continued to drive from their house outside Havana (Finca Vigía) to the Floridita for drinks. The establishment today contains many noticeable memorabilia of the author, with photographs, a bust, and more recently (2003), a life-size bronze statue at the end of the bar near the wall, sculpted by the Cuban artist José Villa Soberón.

Hemingway wasn't the only famous customer of the bar. The establishment was frequented by many generations of Cuban and foreign intellectuals and artists. Ezra Pound, John Dos Passos, and Graham Greene, the British novelist who wrote Our Man in Havana, were also frequent customers.

The place still preserves much of the atmosphere of the 1940s and 1950s, with the red coats of the bartenders matching the Regency style decoration that dates from the 1950s, although now most of its customers are occasional tourists. Besides the cocktails, the place is well known for its expensive seafood.

== See also ==
- List of buildings in Havana
