= Eusebio Leal =

Cuban historian (1942–2020)

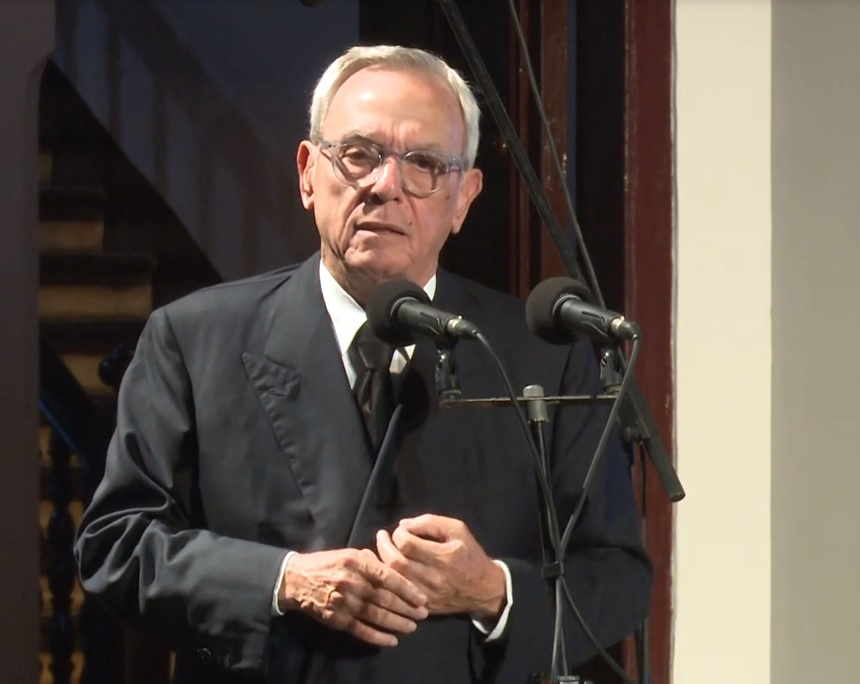
- Born: Eusebio Leal Spengler; 11 September 1942; Havana, Cuba
- Died: 31 July 2020 (aged 77); Havana, Cuba
- Education: University of Havana
- Occupation: Historian
- Known for: Restoration of Old Havana

Eusebio Leal Spengler (11 September 1942 – 31 July 2020) was a Cuban historian. He served as the municipal historian of Havana, as well as the director of the restoration project of Old Havana. Under his oversight, the historic centre of the capital city became a UNESCO World Heritage Site. He also authored books and hosted radio and television programs that recounted the city and its history.

== Early life ==
Leal was born in Havana on 11 September 1942. He was raised by a single mother, who was a washerwoman and cleaner. He dropped out of school during grade six in order to support the two of them. Although he did not receive further formal schooling, he passed the university entrance exam through self-learning. He studied at the University of Havana, obtaining a master's degree in Latin American, Caribbean, and Cuban studies and a doctorate of historical science from the same institution. During his studies, he would read in the small museum run by Emilio Roig de Leushenring, to whom he was introduced in 1962. Leal would go on to be mentored by Roig, until the latter's death in 1964.

== Career ==
Leal succeeded Roig as the city historian of Havana in 1967. One of his first tasks was to renovate the Palacio de los Capitanes Generales, situated on the Plaza de Armas. The project took 11 years to complete and, by the end of the 1970s, became the municipal museum with Leal selected to be its first director. Subsequently, he managed to have the entire Old Havana cited as a World Heritage Site by UNESCO in 1982. Leal was able to put his master plan of refurbishing 30 buildings into action with the support of Fidel Castro.

The dissolution of the Soviet Union in 1991, coupled with the cessation of sugar subsidies, resulted in a period of economic hardship in Cuba called the Special Period. Leal realised that the Cuban state could not fund the restoration of Old Havana directly. As a result, he persuaded Castro to pass part of the profits from commercial businesses set up in the area to fund the restoration. For that purpose, he established several companies to draw foreign investment into the country. This included Habaguanex S.A., a tourist-management company that owned hotels and restaurants, and was not liable to tax on its profits.

Leal was accorded unparalleled freedom from government intervention, such as being granted US$1 million in seed money to be used at his own discretion. He also was allocated a special security force to protect him at historical sites.

The successful revitalization effort, and the broad powers given to him by the government, resulted in Leal becoming the de facto mayor of Old Havana. He would greet foreign heads of state at the airport from time to time, and supervise cultural and state events. He was also a member of the ruling Cuban Communist Party's elite Central Committee and eventually, was regarded as an elder statesman.

=== Other positions ===
Leal was president of the Commission of Monuments in the City of Havana and a specialist in Archeological Sciences. He also served as deputy to the National Assembly, as well as a goodwill ambassador for the United Nations. He established his own radio and television show entitled, "Andar la Habana", in which he chronicled forgotten historical accounts while taking a stroll down the streets of Old Havana. He wrote a number of books about Havana, including Desafío de Una Utopía (Challenge of a Utopia, 1996), which explored how Old Havana could be preserved, and La Habana, ciudad antigua (Havana, ancient city, 1988).

== Personal life ==
Leal was a close friend of Fidel Castro and his brother Raúl. Nonetheless, he eschewed making open political expressions, preferring to identify himself as a "Fidelist" rather than a Marxist. His predominantly moderate political positions led to him being excluded from a key promotion when Raul became president in February 2008; however, he ultimately remained in his post.

Leal was a devout Roman Catholic. He credited his enjoyment of restoring historical structures to his early commitment to the Church. Consequently, he championed the freedom of religion for all those who also wanted to participate in the Communist Party. His faith drew the ire of many bureaucrats within the party, however, he saw no disjuncture between religion and revolution, stating in a 2010 interview that "for me they were never incompatible".

Leal's son, Javier, runs a travel agency and an art gallery in Barcelona, Spain.

Leal died on the morning of 31 July 2020. He was 77, and had been suffering from cancer.

== Awards and honours ==
Leal was promoted to Commander of the Legion of Honour in January 2013, having previously been Knight and Officer of that same order. In 2017, he received both the Order of Isabella the Catholic from the Spanish government, as well as the Order of Merit of the Federal Republic of Germany. The following year, the Order of Merit was bestowed on him by Chile. Subsequently, during a visit to Cuba by Felipe VI of Spain in November 2019, he was awarded the Grand Cross of the Order of Charles III. Leal served as guide to both Felipe and Queen Letizia during their tour of Old Havana.

In addition to those from his home country, Leal received honorary degrees from universities in Chile, Greece, Italy, Peru, and Uruguay.

=== Other honours ===
- Officer of the Order of Merit of the Italian Republic
- Order of Merit of the Republic of Poland, Gold Star
- Order of Merit for Distinguished Services of the Republic of Peru, Grand Cross
- Order of Merit of the Republic of Colombia, Commander
- Order of Academic Palms of France, Officer
- Order of the Arts and Letters of France

=== Awards ===
- International Architecture Prize Philippe Rothie of Belgium
- 2002 Prize of the Association for the Management of the Urban Centers AGECU in the Section of Latin American Initiative, Valencia, Spain
- First Prize to the Restoration of the city of Alcalá de Henares
- Prize ARPAFIL of the International Book Fair of Guadalajara 2002
- Prize of the city of Barcelona of 1998
- Prize of the city of Valencia
- Prize Arthur Posnansky granted by the Presidency of the Republic of Bolivia
- Prize of the Royal Foundation of Toledo for the Rehabilitation of the Historical Center of Havana, in an act presided over by the King of Spain
- Golden Medal for Merit to Culture – Gloria Artis, Poland
- Commemorative medal on the 1300 years of the Bulgarian State
- Commemorative medal on the 40th Anniversary of the Victory over Fascism of the People's Republic of Bulgaria
- Commemorative medal on the 40th Anniversary of the Victory over Fascism of the Czechoslovak Socialist Republic
- Pablo Neruda Medal of Presidential Honor, Republic of Chile
- Victor Hugo Medal of UNESCO
- Henry Hope Reed Award, 2016
