= Habaguanex =

Taino Cacique in Cuba

Habaguanex was a Ciboney cacique (Indigenous chief) who controlled the area of Havana, Cuba.

== History ==
In the early 1500s, the Indigenous Ciboney people of Havana, Cuba, were led by their cacique (tribal chieftain), Habaguanex.

San Cristóbal de La Habana, the name given to Cuba's capital in 1519, is believed to reference the local chief's name. Theories suggest that the name combined San Cristóbal—honoring the patron saint of travelers—with the chief's name, adjusted to Spanish phonetics.

The national hospitality agency, Habaguanex S.A., is named after him.

== See also ==
- Indigenous peoples of Cuba
- List of Cubans
