= Hotel Ambos Mundos (Havana) =

Hotel in Havana, Cuba

Coordinates: 23°08′22″N 82°21′02″W

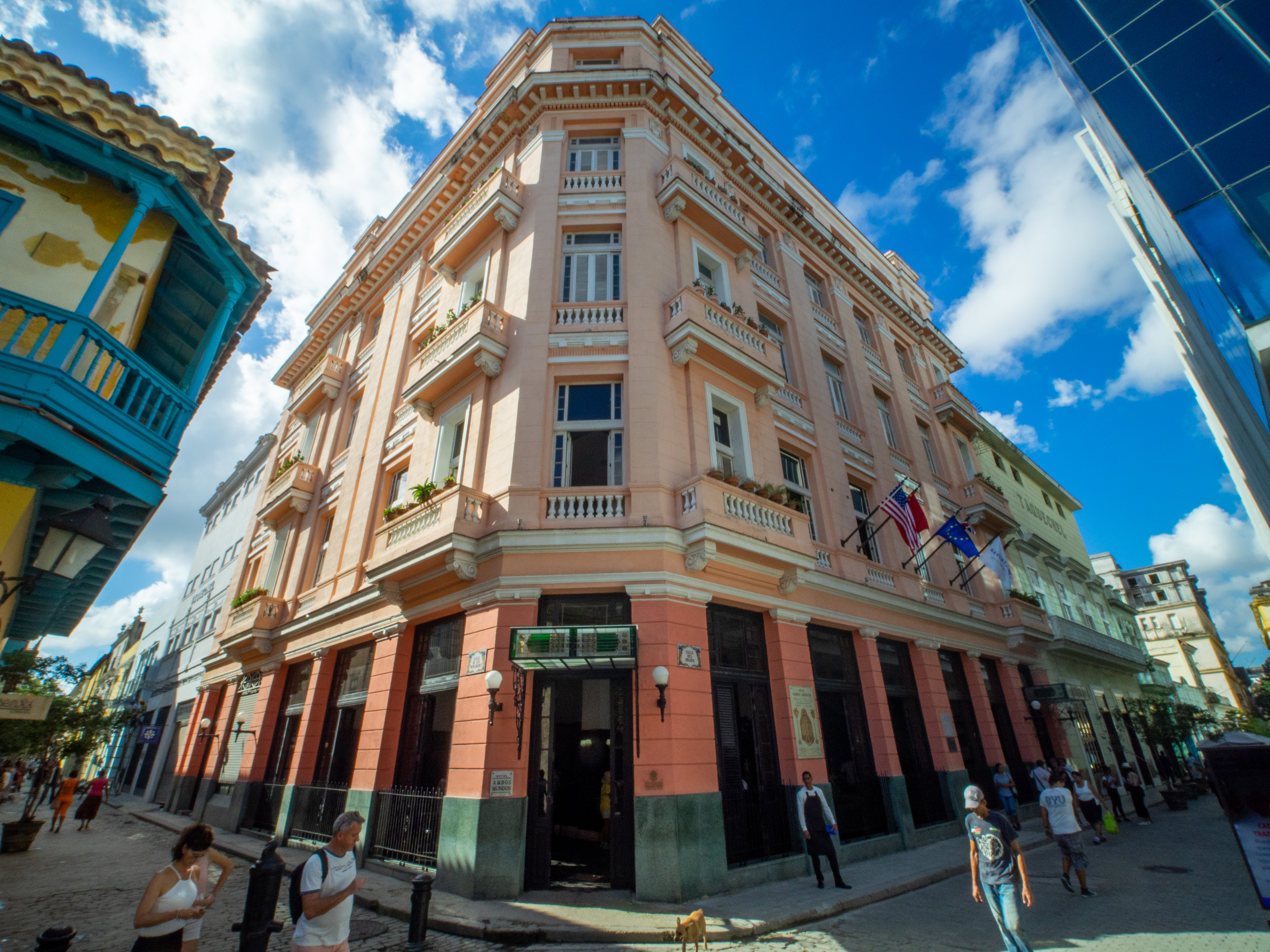
- Hotel Ambos Mundos

General information
- Location: Havana, Cuba, Calle Obispo no. 153, La Habana
- Opening: 1925
- Owner: Habaguanex S.A.

Technical details
- Floor count: 5

Design and construction
- Architect: Luis Wise Hernandez

Other information
- Number of rooms: 52
- Number of suites: 3

Website
- www.hotelambosmundos-cuba.com

The Hotel Ambos Mundos (Spanish pronunciation: [oˈtel ˈambos ˈmundos], Both Worlds Hotel) is a hotel in Havana, Cuba. Built with a square form with five floors, it has an eclectic set of characteristics of 20th-century style architecture. It was built in 1924 on a site that previously had been occupied by an old family house on the corner of Calle Obispo and Mercaderes (Bishop and Merchants Streets) in Old Havana. It is a frequent tourist destination because it was home to the popular writer Ernest Hemingway for seven years in the 1930s.

== History ==
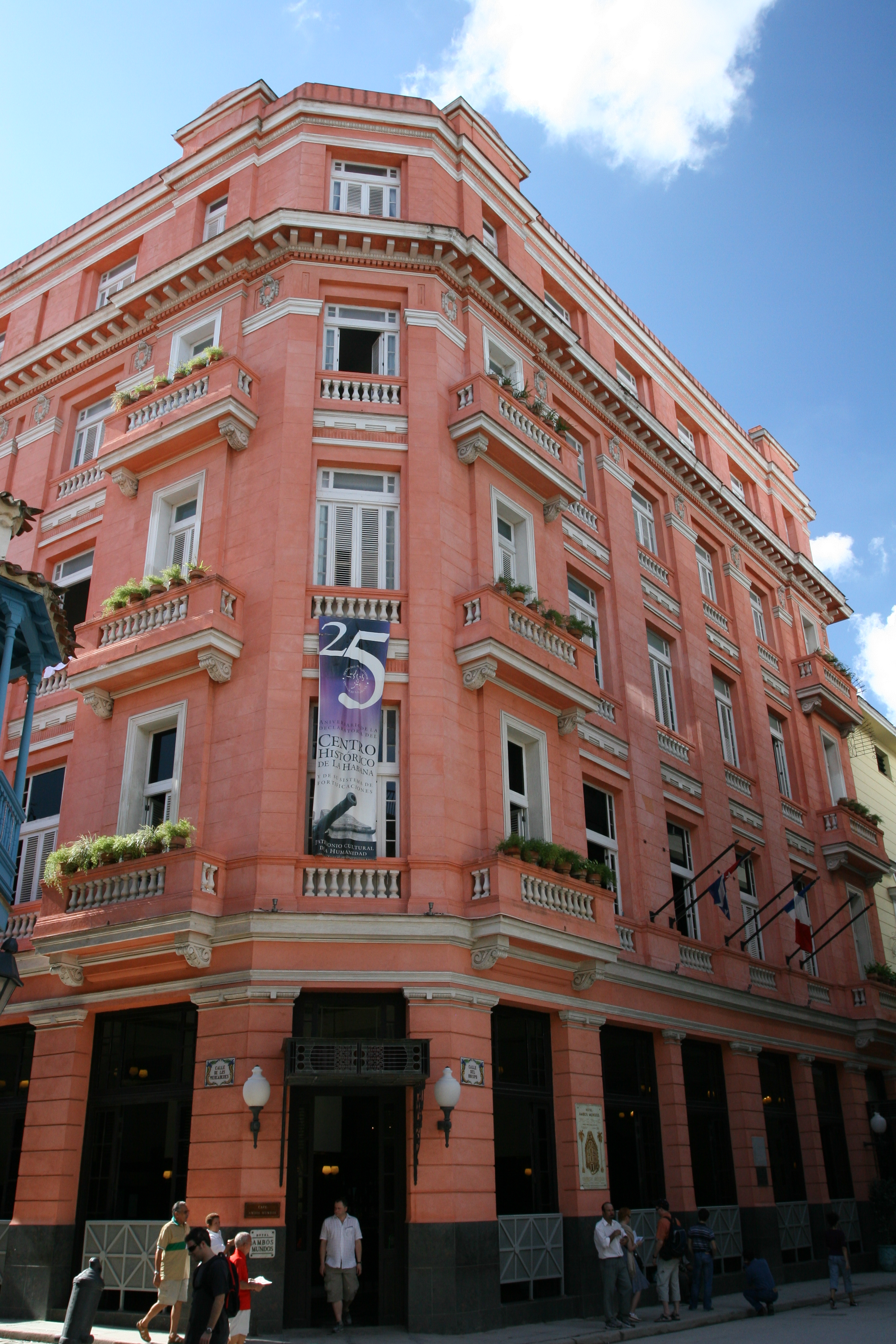
The Ambos Mundos Hotel viewed from the corner of Calle Obispo and Mercaderes

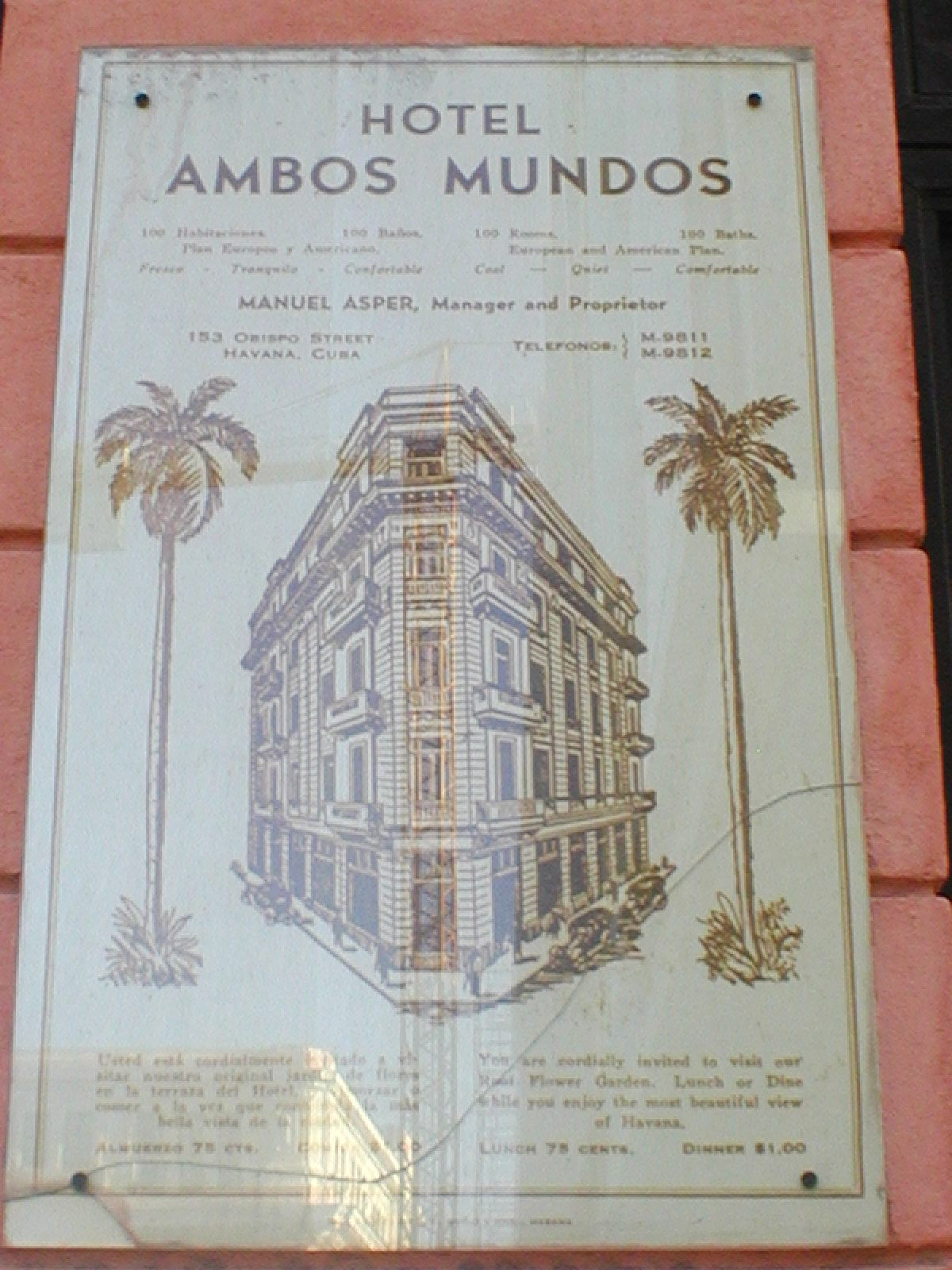
Close up of the hotel front address plate, which may also be seen at just above head-level from the street, in the photograph above

From colonial times the zone of Old Havana in which the building is now sited was populated by a diverse collection of family houses. At the beginning of the 20th century, the Spanish retailer Antolín Blanco Arias bought a family house on the site, from his office colleague Manuel Llerandi y Tomé. The new owner demolished the very old house to construct the hotel, the work being in charge of the architect Luis Wise Hernandez.

In the 1930s this hotel was the property of the Asper family. Hotel Ambos Mundos was a family hotel, that attracted writers, actors and actresses, and many Americans.

This hotel since has gained international note from its most famous long-time tenant: in 1932 a room on the upper (5th) floor became the “first home” in Cuba of writer Ernest Hemingway, who enjoyed the views of Old Havana, and the harbor in which he fished frequently in his yacht Pilar. Hemingway rented the room for $1.50 per night ($1.75 for double occupancy) until mid-1939, when he transferred his winter residence from Key West (a U.S. island 90 miles from Cuba) to a house in the hills near Havana, Finca Vigia, which he shared with Martha Gellhorn (they were married in 1940). Hemingway began his novel For Whom the Bell Tolls, a novel of the Spanish Civil War which he had witnessed over the previous several years, in the room in the Ambos Mundos, on 1 March 1939.

Today, his hotel room, No. 511, is presented as if the author might have left it, and is a small museum in the middle of the establishment, with tours given regularly in the daytime. The corner of the ground floor hotel lobby also has two walls of framed photographs dedicated to Hemingway.

In 1987, the hotel underwent some small restoration, with more complete work finalized in 1997 to turn it once again into a luxurious hotel reminiscent of its time. Between 2004 and 2005, further maintenance was carried out, cleaning and painting the hotel's facades.

== Structure ==
As originally conceived, the three-story building plan had the following distribution: the ground floor served as a commercial center, and in the upper two floors were the rooms for the guests. The fused concrete and steel structure of the building gave an eclectic and modern character for its time of manufacture. In 1924, the original plan was extended, gaining height to a final five stories. Finally, the structure was officially declared habitable on 6 January 1925.

Five years after construction a hall was placed in the roof giving views of the Harbor from the top of the building and adding a kitchen and services. Presently the building contains its original still-functioning Otis screen-cage elevators, and a lobby with a low open freshwater fountain/pool in which turtles are maintained.

== Gallery ==
Hotel Ambos Mundos in Old Havana

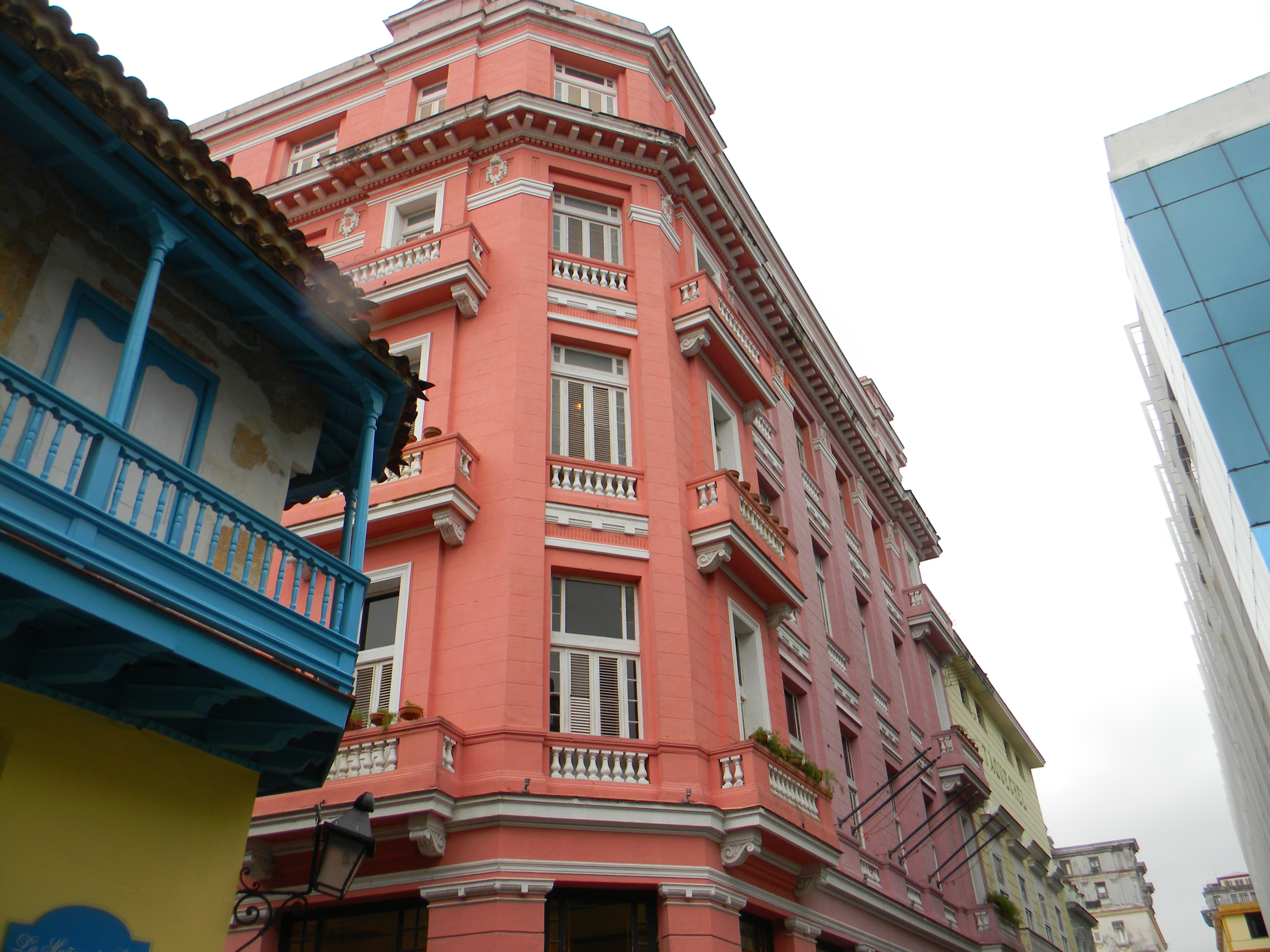

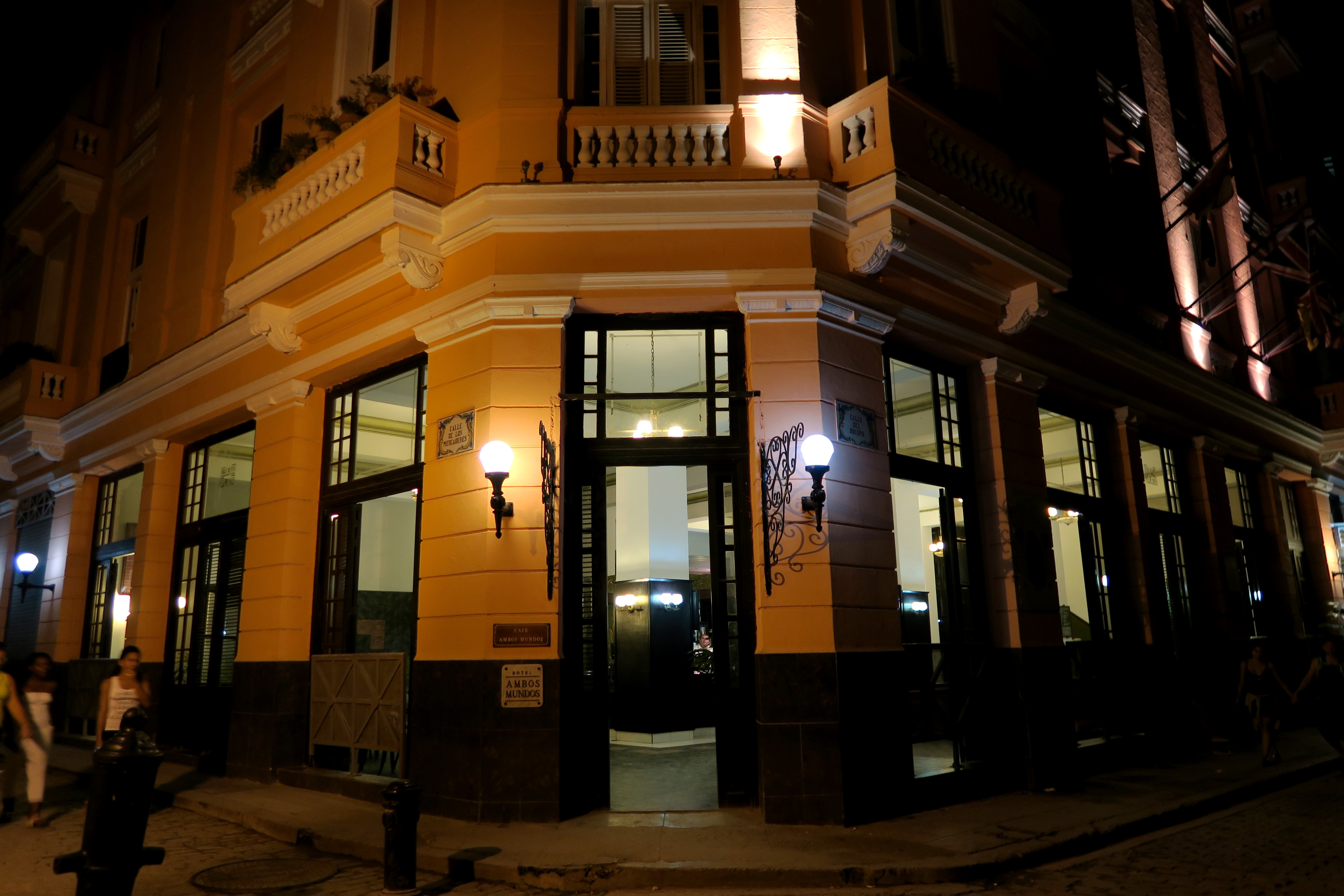

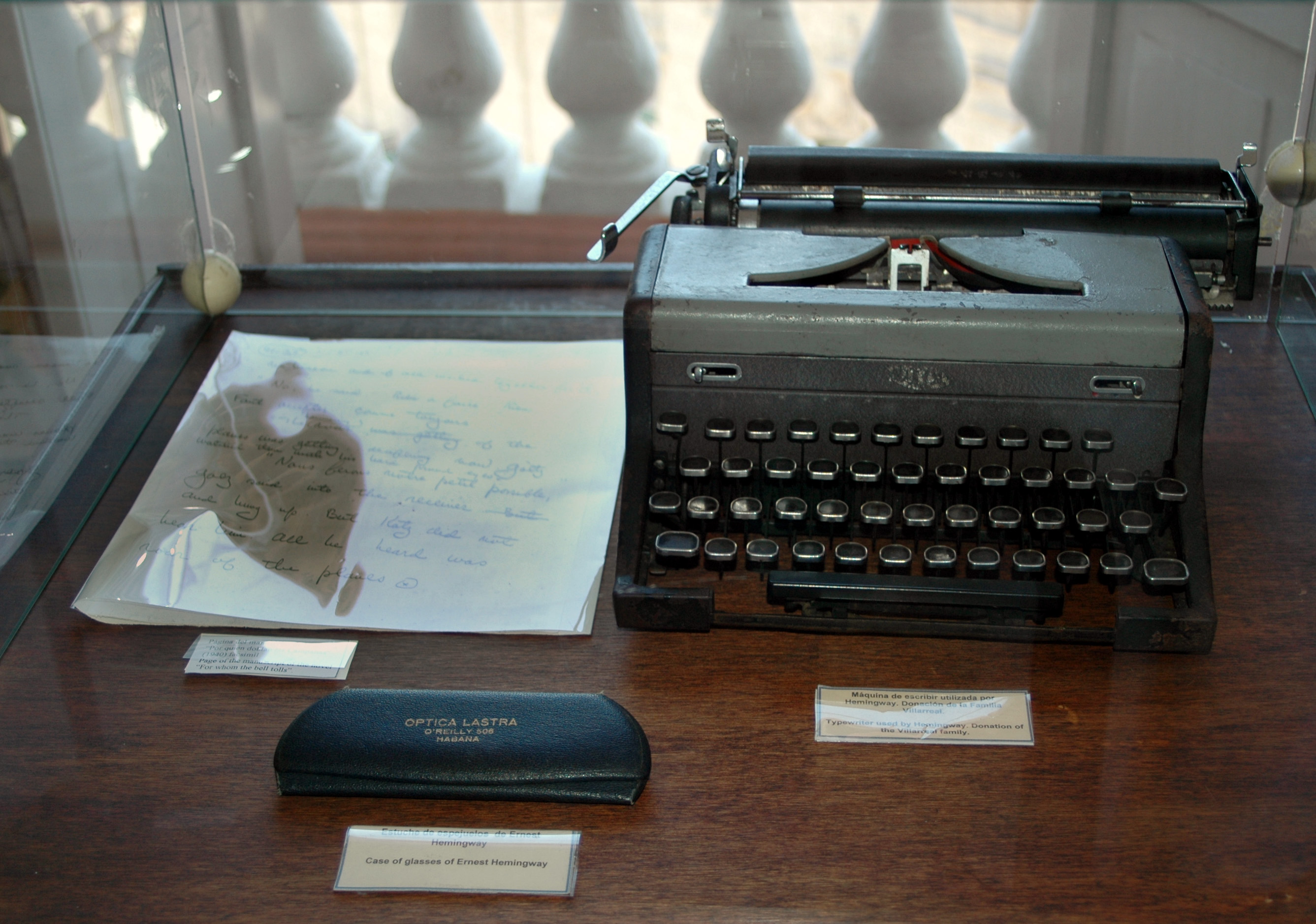

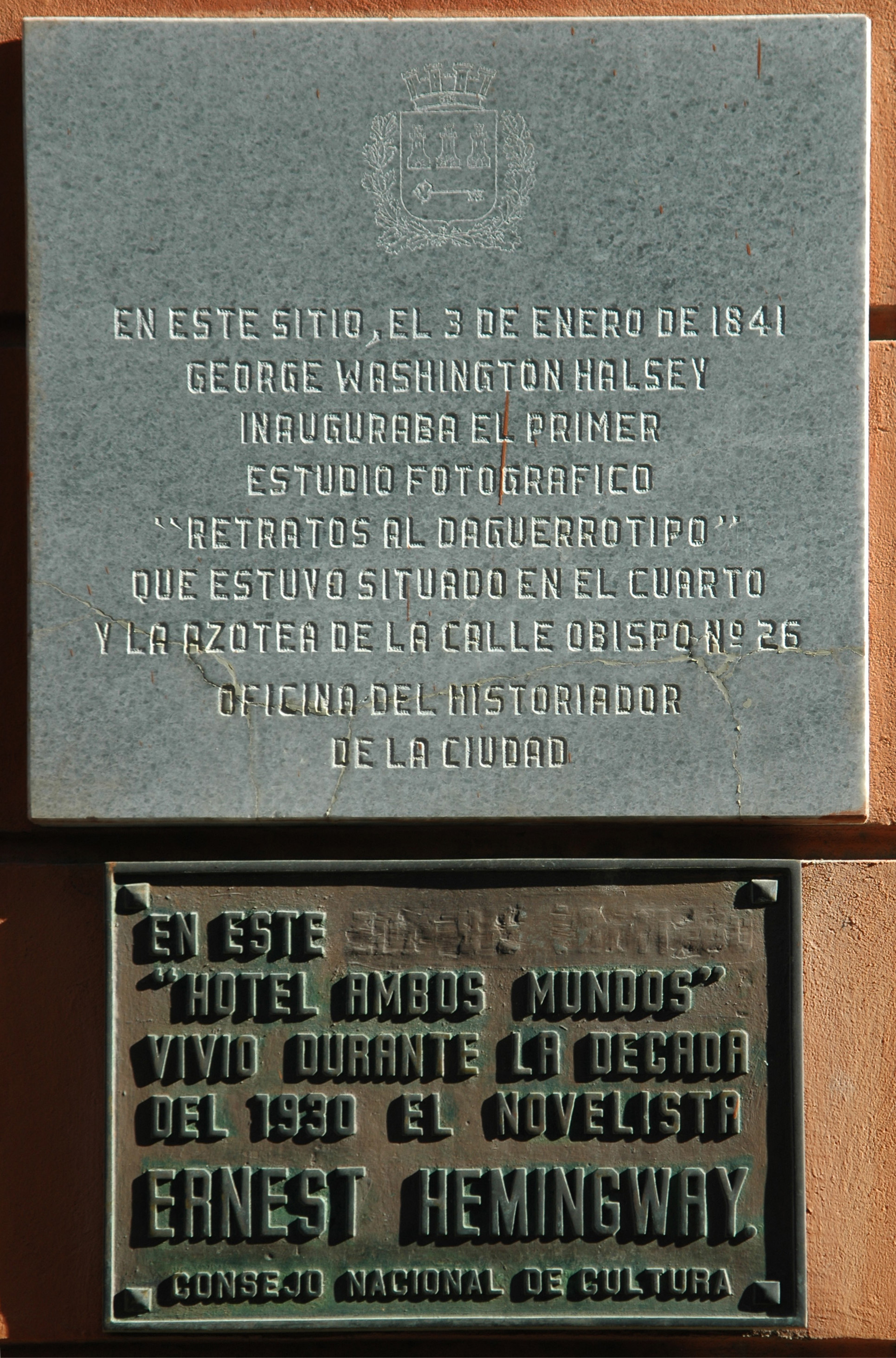
