= Habaguanex S.A. =

The Habaguanex S.A. is a Cuban hospitality company which was founded by the Office of the Historian of Havana City and directed by Eusebio Leal.

== History ==
The Habaguanex Tourist Company was founded on 6 January 1994. Habaguanex S.A. offers a historical hospitality experience with high architectural, cultural and historical significance, mainly in Old Havana, a UNESCO World Heritage Site since 1982. The company dedicated some of its ihe income to restore the historic centre of the city and to improve the living conditions of the local population. The company was administered by the Oficina del Historiador de la Ciudad de la Habana (OHCH).

In 2012, the Habaguanex Tourist Company was tangled in a corruption affair.

In August 2016, the ownership of the company was transferred from the City Historian's Office to the Cuban Revolutionary Armed Forces. In 2017, the Habaguanex Tourist Company was acquired by CIMEX and TRD Caribe, two companies owned by the military consortium GAESA (Grupo de Administración Empresarial.) The hotels and restaurants owned by the group became part of the Gaviota Tourism Group. Subsequently, the US Department of State added all the Habaguanex-related locations on the State Dept.'s "restricted list" prohibiting "direct financial transactions" by those under US jurisdiction.

== Description ==
This company takes its name from the chieftain Habaguanex who ruled the area where Havana is located today before Christopher Columbus arrived in Cuba.

The Habaguanex Tourist Company manages more than 300 facilities including restaurants (La Factoría brewery), shops, markets, coffee shops and hotels of different categories, mainly in the Old Havana..

== Hotels ==
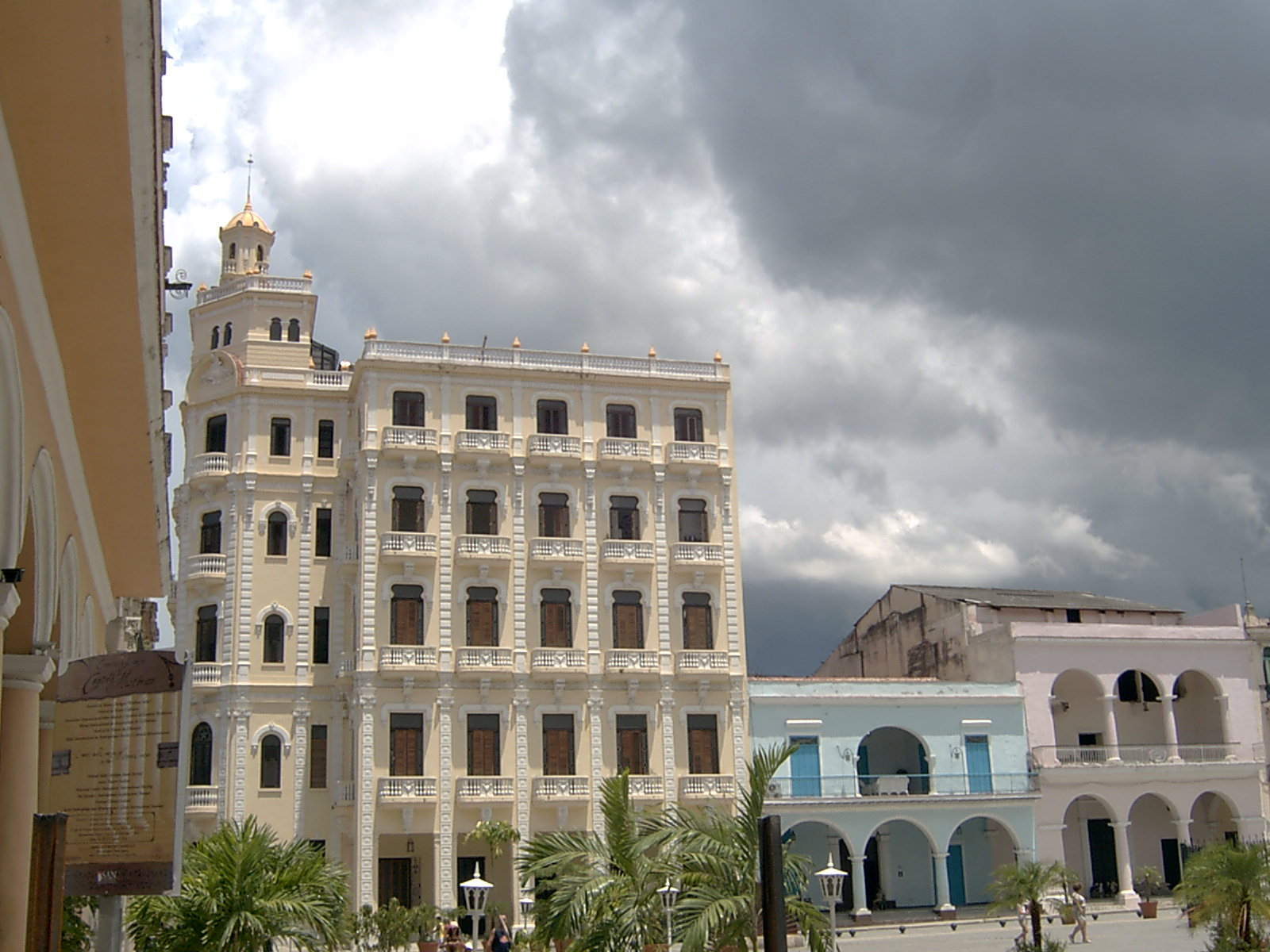
Colonial buildings around the Old Square

- Ambos Mundos (related to Hemingway's presence in Havana)
- Armadores de Santander
- Beltrán de Santa Cruz
- Comendador
- Conde de Villanueva (tribute to Cuban cigars)
- Florida
- Los Frailes (religious ambience)
- Marqués de Prado Ameno
- Mesón de la Flota
- Palacio O'Farrill
- Park View
- Raquel (tribute to the Jewish culture)
- San Felipe (one of the grandest baroque houses in Havana)
- San Miguel
- Saratoga (upscale)
- Santa Isabel (former residence of a wealthy family)
- Tejadillo
- Telégrafo
- Valencia (tribute to the Valencia region in Spain)
