= Finca Vigía =

House in San Francisco de Paula Ward in Havana, Cuba

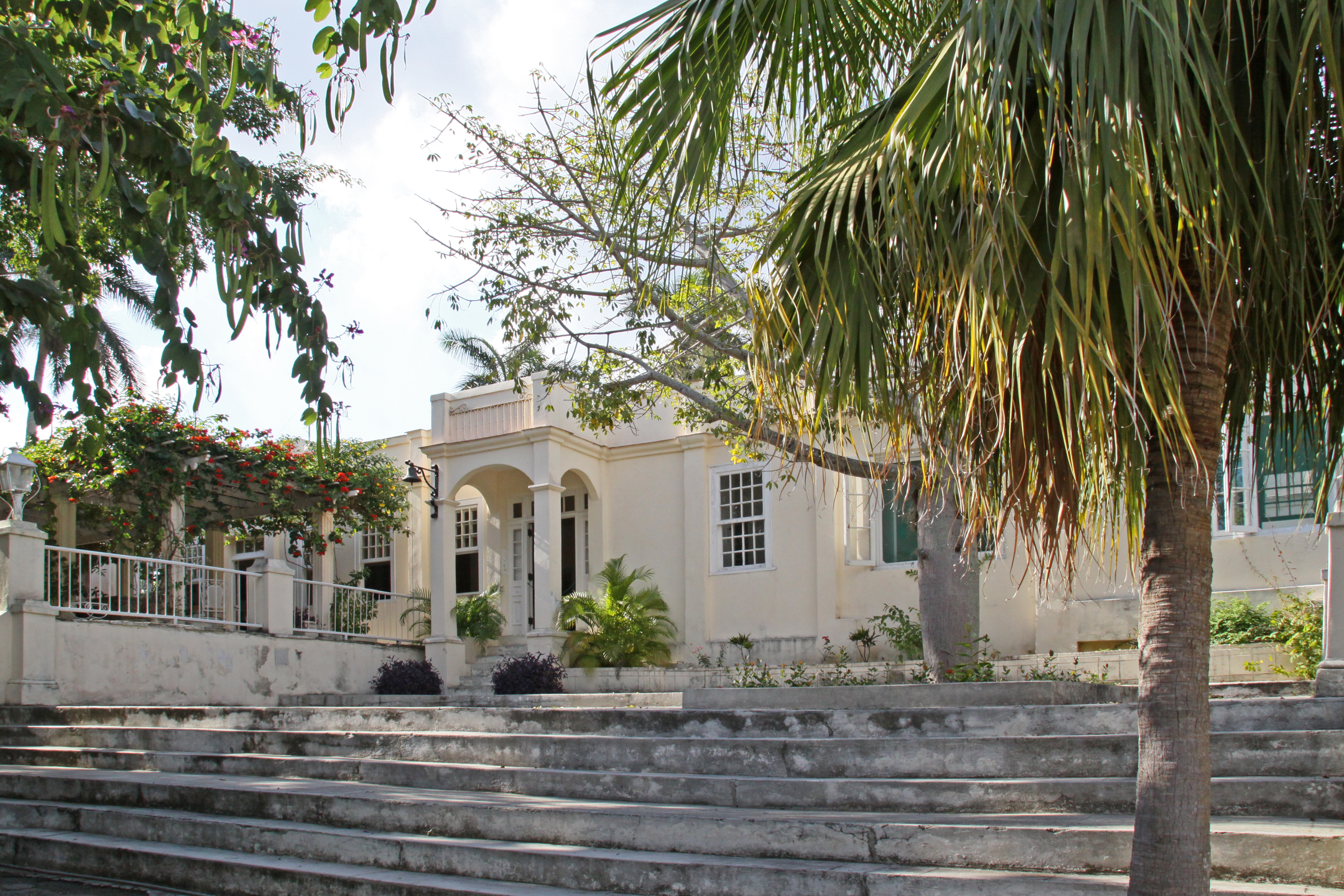
- The house's exterior

- Location within Cuba
- Alternative names: Lookout Farm

General information
- Location: San Miguel del Padrón, Havana, Cuba
- Coordinates: 23.067742°N 82.296417°W
- Opened: 1886.

Design and construction
- Architect: Miguel Pascual y Baguer
- Known for: residence of Ernest Hemingway

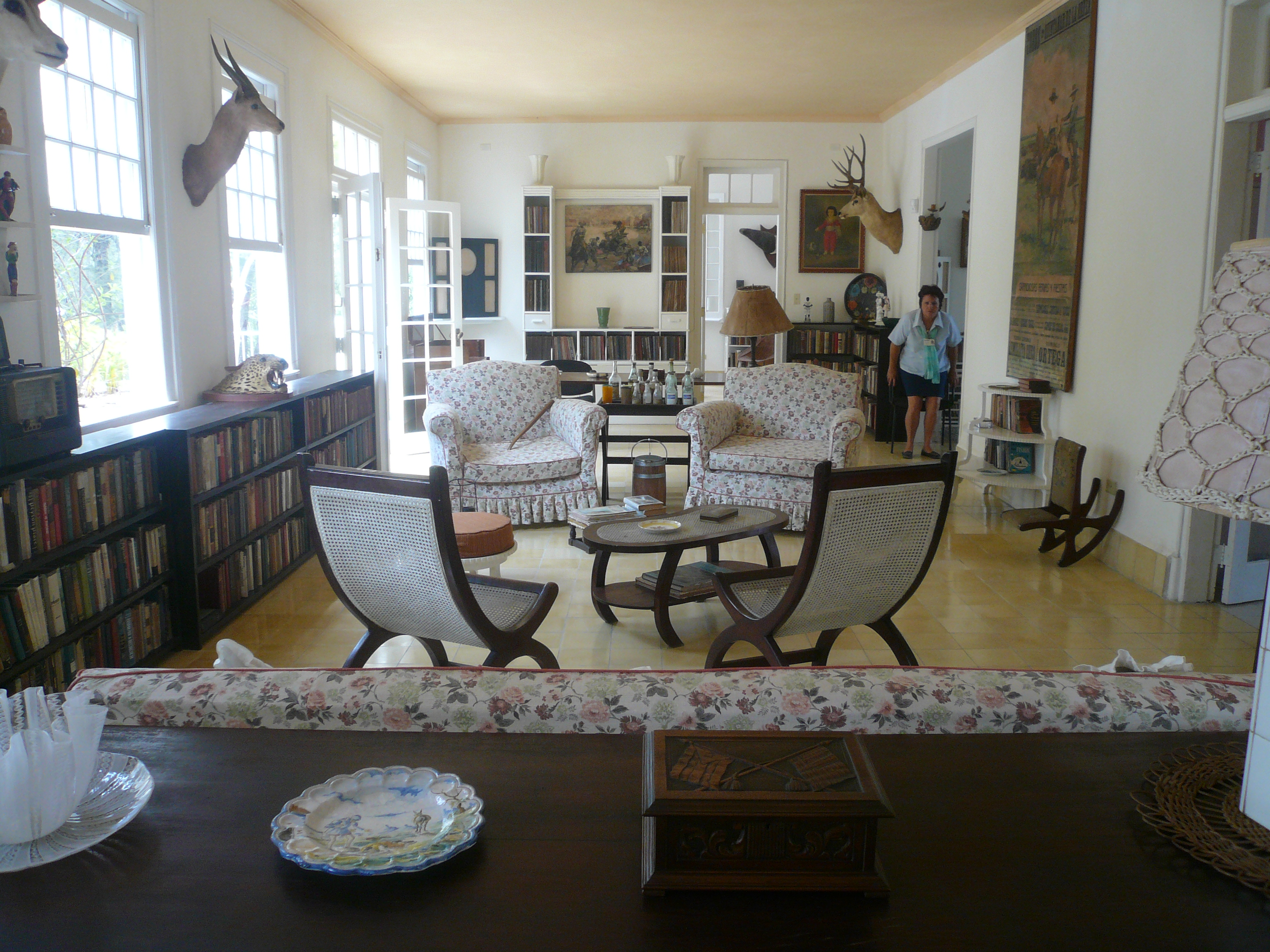
The main living-room of the Finca Vigía

Finca Vigía (Spanish pronunciation: [ˈfiŋka βiˈxi.a], lit. 'Lookout Farm') is a house in San Francisco de Paula ward in Havana, Cuba, which was once the residence of Ernest Hemingway. Like Hemingway's Key West home, it is now a museum. The building was constructed in 1886.

== History of the property ==
The house was built in 1886 by Catalan architect Miguel Pascual y Baguer on a hill about 8 miles (13 km) southeast of Havana on the land that was occupied by a surveillance barracks of the Spanish Army, hence the place name that gives the Estate its name: Vigía. The back veranda and adjacent tower provide an excellent view of downtown Havana.

== The Hemingway family ==
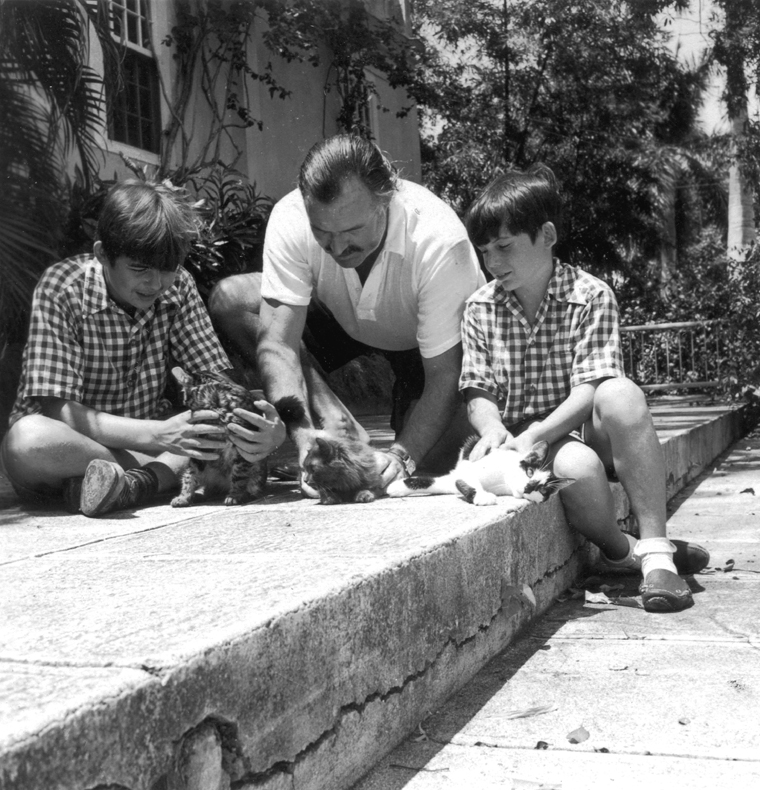
Hemingway with his two younger sons (Patrick, left, and Gregory) and three of the Hemingways' first Cuban cats (Will, Princessa, and Boise), at Finca Vigía, in late 1942 or early 1943. (JFK Library)

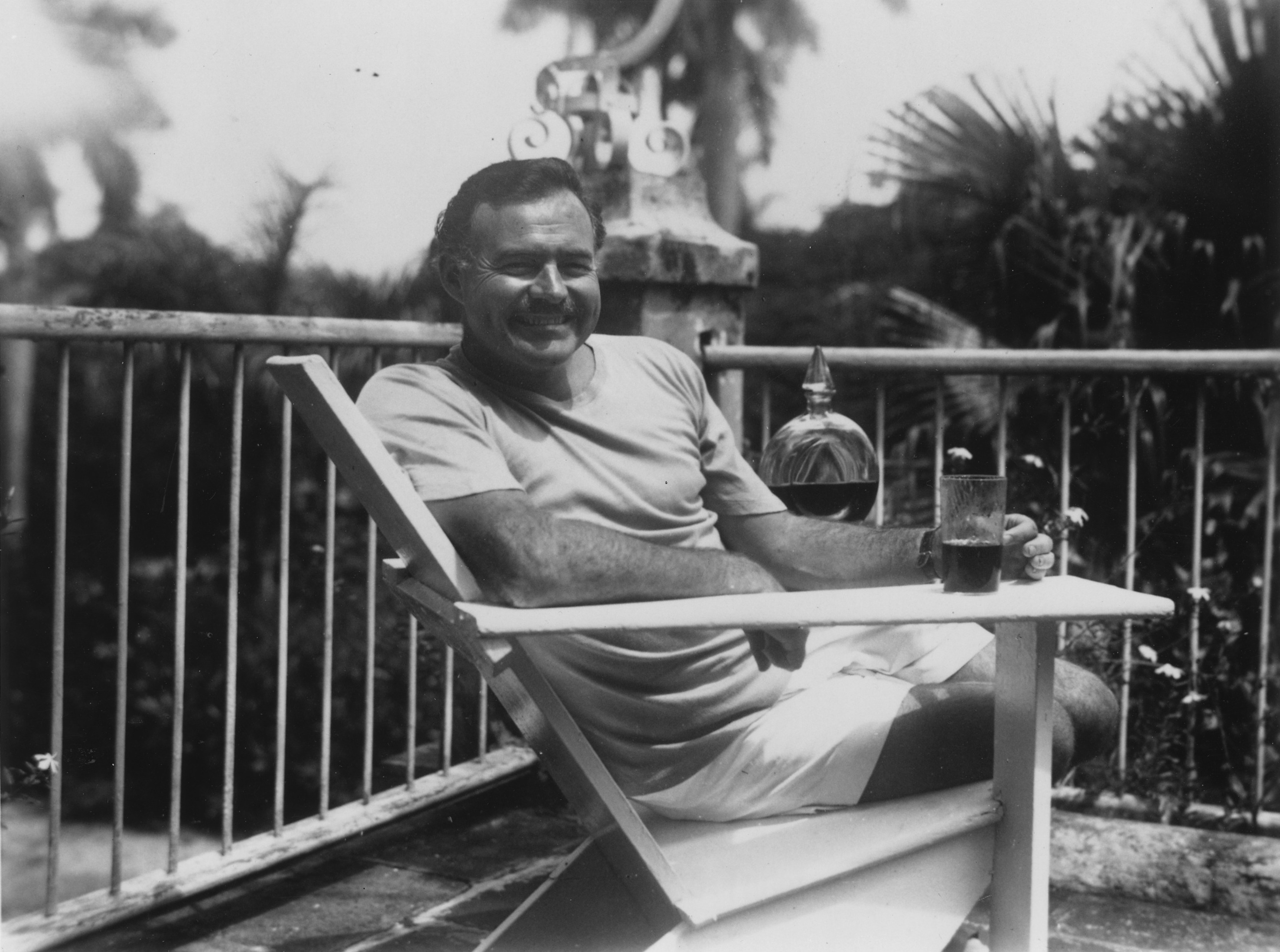
Ernest Hemingway at the Finca Vigia in 1946

Hemingway lived in the house from mid-1939 to 1960, first renting it, and then buying it in December 1940 after he married Martha Gellhorn, his third wife. Gellhorn, who had come to Cuba to be with Hemingway, decided that she did not want to live in the small room he rented at the Hotel Ambos Mundos. She found the property for which Hemingway paid $12,500. The finca at the time consisted of 15 acres (61,000 m^{2}) with a farmhouse.

While at Finca Vigía, Hemingway wrote much of For Whom the Bell Tolls, a novel of the Spanish Civil War which he had covered as a journalist with Gellhorn in the late 1930s. (He had started the novel while living at the Hotel Ambos Mundos, and some of it was written in Idaho.) Hemingway bought the property with some of the first royalties from the book, which was published in 1940. After Hemingway and Gellhorn divorced in 1945, Hemingway kept Finca Vigía and lived there during the winters with Mary Welsh Hemingway, his last wife.

At the finca, Hemingway also wrote The Old Man and the Sea (1951) about a fisherman who lived in the nearby town of Cojimar and worked the waters off Havana.

In the early 1940s, during the Second World War, Hemingway's three sons often visited him at the finca, sometimes staying in a small house that Martha ("Marty") Hemingway had fixed up for them.

The guest house, a converted one-story wooden garage, is now used as offices for the museum director and staff and for meetings. They reported that the property then was overgrown with manigua and flamboyan trees, but that most of the rural land has since been taken over by housing. In those early days there was also a tennis court, a pool and water wells.

At the finca Hemingway began to keep and breed cats (in Key West, he had kept only peacocks). Hemingway started with a gray Angora cat named Princessa (middle cat in photo) obtained in Key West from a breeder, and in 1942 picked up two male Cuban kittens named Good Will and Boise (left and right cats in photo). Hemingway wrote extensively about the habits of Boise. By 1943, the cat population at the finca numbered 11. When Mary Hemingway moved into the finca in 1946, she had a workshop tower constructed on the property for Hemingway to write in, but he preferred to work in his bedroom, and the workshop was eventually assigned to the cats. Today, there are no cats on the Cuban property, but there are several at the home in Key West, some with "thumbs", (i.e., polydactyl cats). There is no evidence that any of Hemingway's Cuban cats were polydactyl.

After the Cuban revolution ousted the US-backed government in January 1959, Hemingway was on good terms with the new Cuban government. In Havana in the summer of 1960, he presented a trophy to Fidel Castro for winning a sport fishing contest named for Hemingway. Nevertheless, as depression and illness overtook him, Hemingway left Cuba for good on July 25, 1960, leaving behind the home that he had used there for more than 20 years.

In the fall of 1960, the Cuban government expropriated a great deal of foreign property, including the Finca Vigía. The U.S. government broke off diplomatic relations with Cuba in October 1960 and imposed a partial financial embargo. After the Bay of Pigs invasion in April 1961 and Cuba's announcement that it was a Communist state in May, relations between Cuba and the U.S. deteriorated further.

Hemingway was being treated for severe depression in the U.S. through the first half of 1961, and the Hemingways could not return to Cuba due to the hostile political climate between the two countries. Hemingway committed suicide at his home in Idaho on July 2, 1961.

The official Cuban government account is that after Hemingway's death, Mary Hemingway deeded the home, complete with furnishings and library, to the Cuban government, which made it into a museum devoted to the author. Mary Hemingway, however, stated that after Hemingway's death, the Cuban government contacted her in Idaho to report that it intended to expropriate the house, along with all real property in Cuba. Mary Hemingway negotiated with the Castro government for certain easily movable personal property (some paintings and a few books), plus manuscripts deposited in a vault in Havana. Most of the Hemingways' personal property, with no way to move it out of the country at the time, had to be abandoned.

== Cuban ownership and stewardship after 1960 ==
One of the home's out buildings

The home, claimed to be in danger of collapse by the US National Trust for Historic Preservation, was restored by the Cuban government and reopened to tourists in 2007. Even so, it has been listed as one of the 11 most-endangered historic sites, despite being outside the US. Also, it is on the World Monuments Fund's biennial list of "100 most endangered sites". Significant disputes and controversies have arisen over the condition of the house and its contents, although researchers who have visited the site have reported that the Cuban government, without funding from the US, has responsibly maintained the house, contents, 38 ft (12 m) wooden fishing boat Pilar, and the grounds.

In a June 2008 newspaper article, Irish thriller writer Adrian McKinty alleged that during a visit to the house, a Cuban secret policeman offered him any book in Hemingway's library for US$200.

== See also ==
- Ernest Hemingway House
- Hotel Ambos Mundos
