= Obispo Street (Havana) =

Street in Havana, Cuba

Coordinates: 23.1387°N 82.3530°W

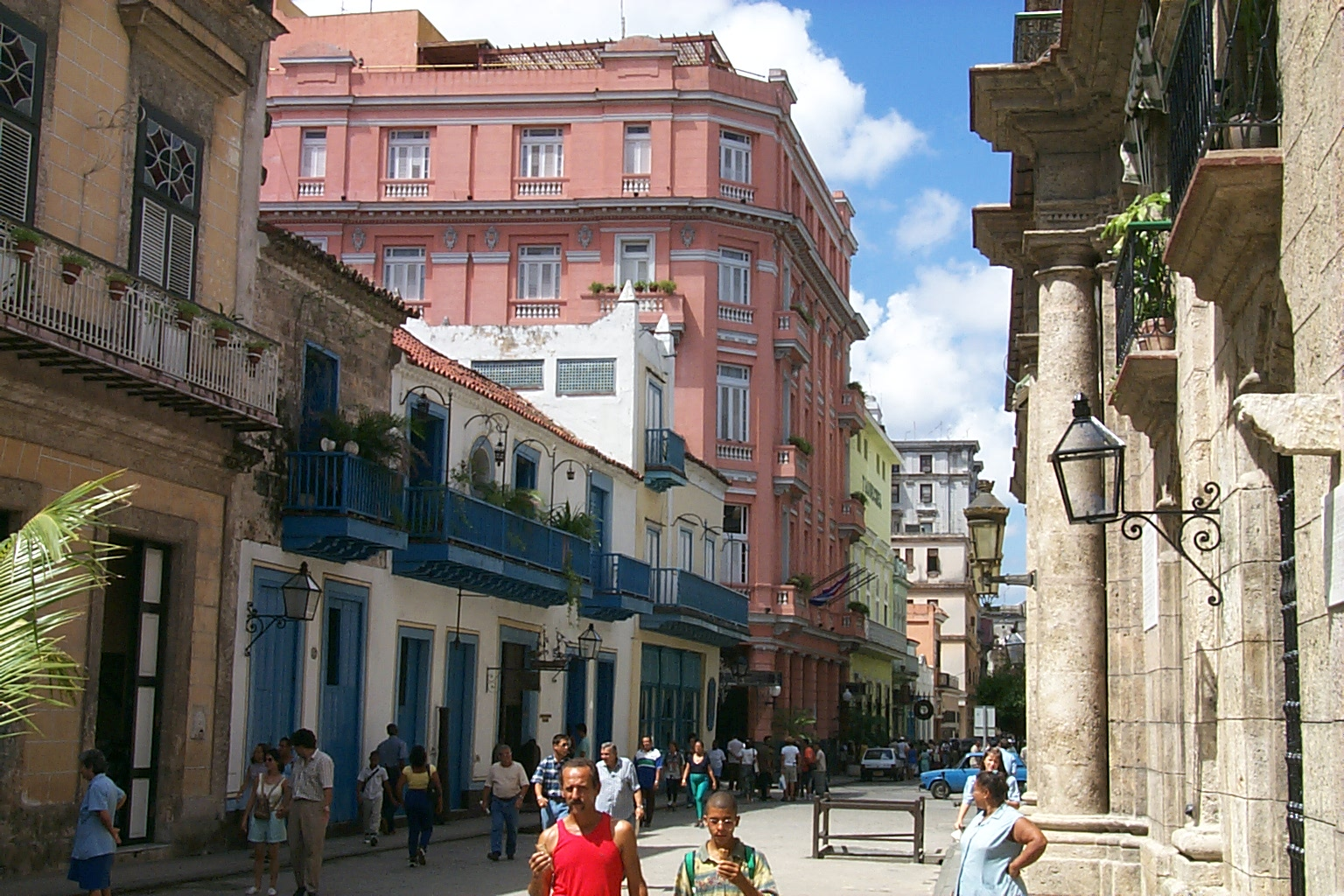

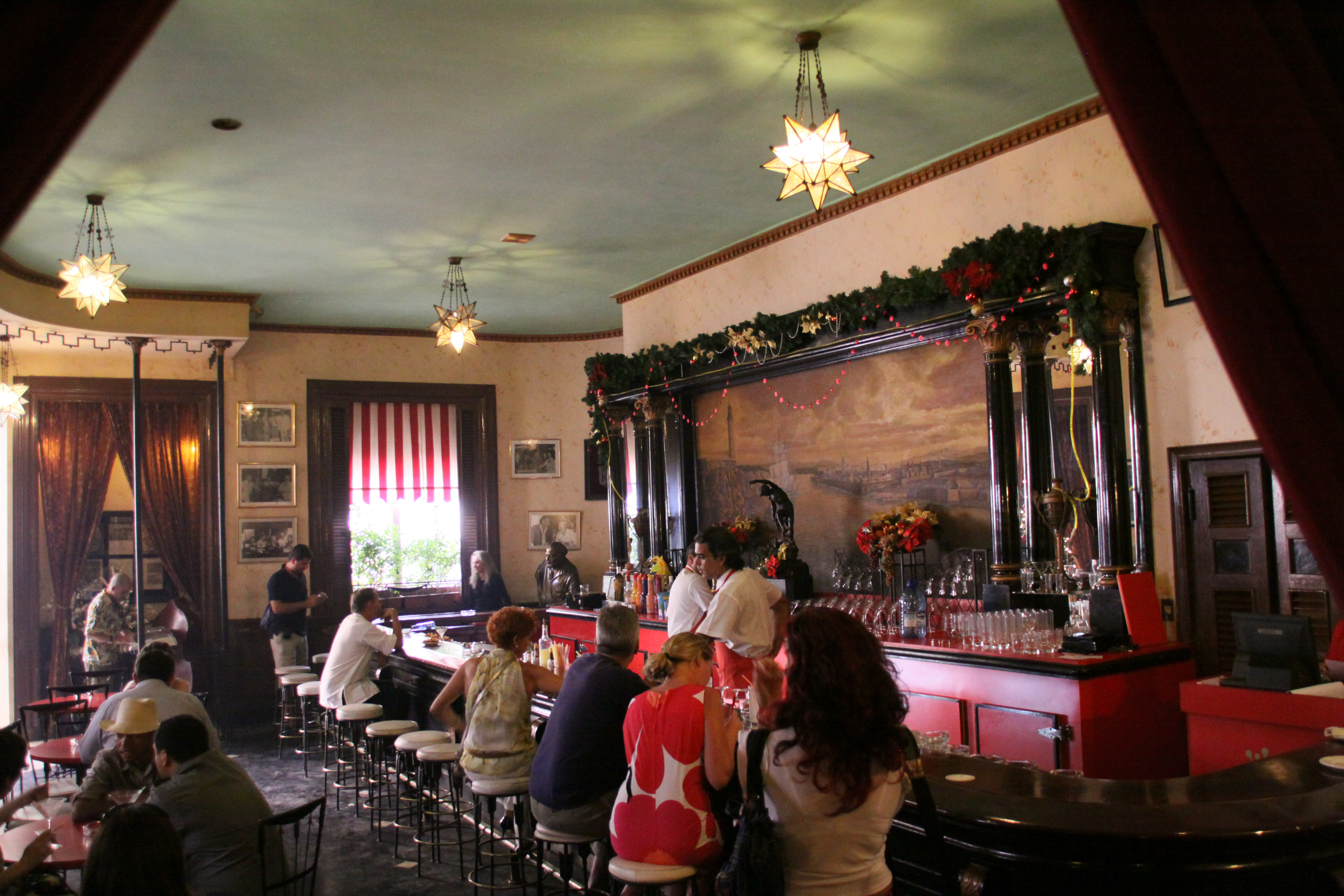
Floridita

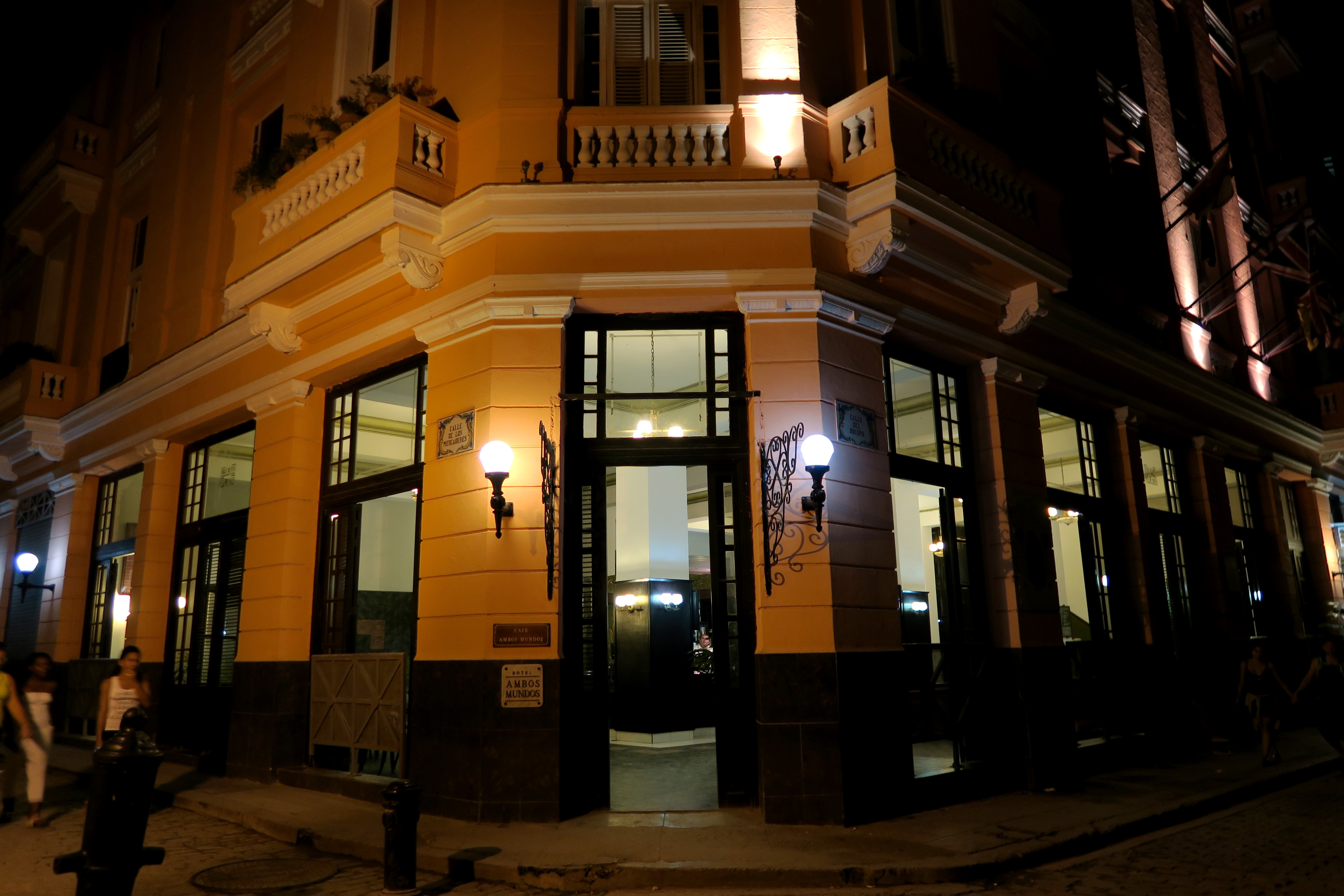
Hotel Ambos Mundos in Old Havana

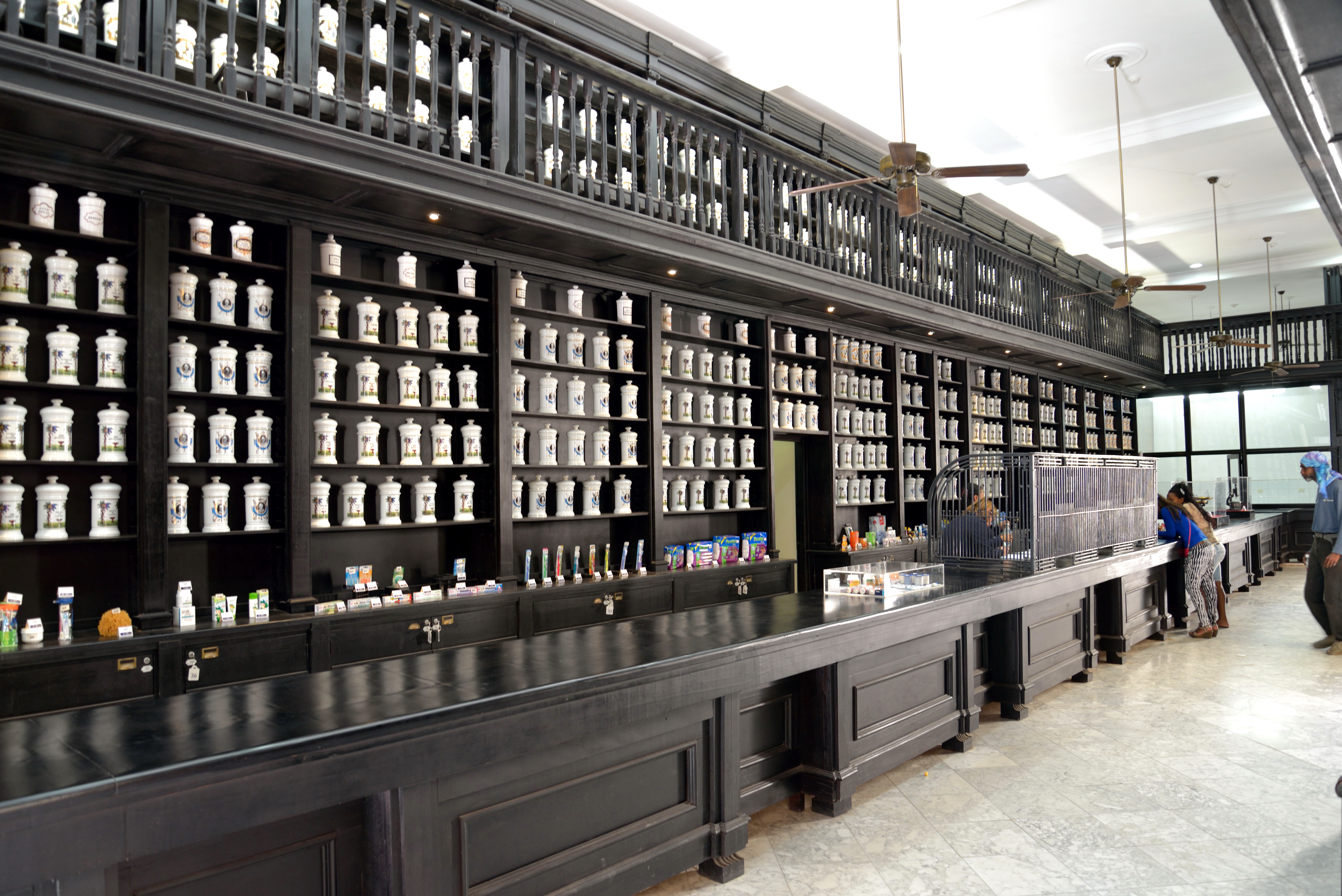
Pharmacy of Bishop Street

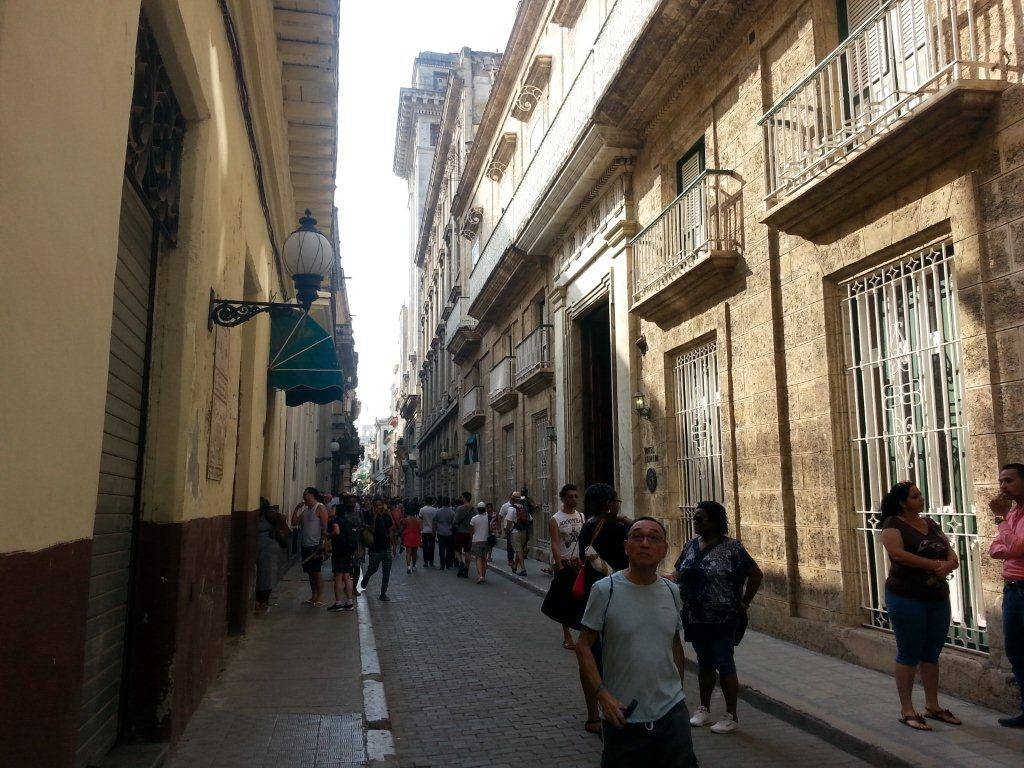
Bishop Street, January 2017

The Obispo Street (Spanish: Calle Obispo) is one of the most famous and traveled streets of Old Havana. During its history, the street has received several names such as: San Juan, Bishop (Obispo), Weyler, Pi Margall, among others, for a total of 47. It is the longest Street in Old Havana. Street shops have always been abundant alongside O'Reilly Street, which is parallel to it from its inception from Zulueta to Havana Bay.

== Places of interest ==
- Palace of the Captains-General
- Plaza de Armas
- National Museum of Natural History of Cuba
- Obispo 463, Sastrería
- Bar "El Floridita"
- Numismatic Museum
- Bookstore "Fayad Jamís"
- House of "Mayorazgo Recio"
- Bookstore La Moderna Poesía
- Ministry of Finance and Price
- Library "Rubén Martínez Villena"
- The house of water "La Tinaja"
- San Jerónimo University
- Cuban Book Institute
