= Basilica of San Francisco de Asís, Havana =

Catholic church in Cuba

Basílica Menor de San Francisco de Asís
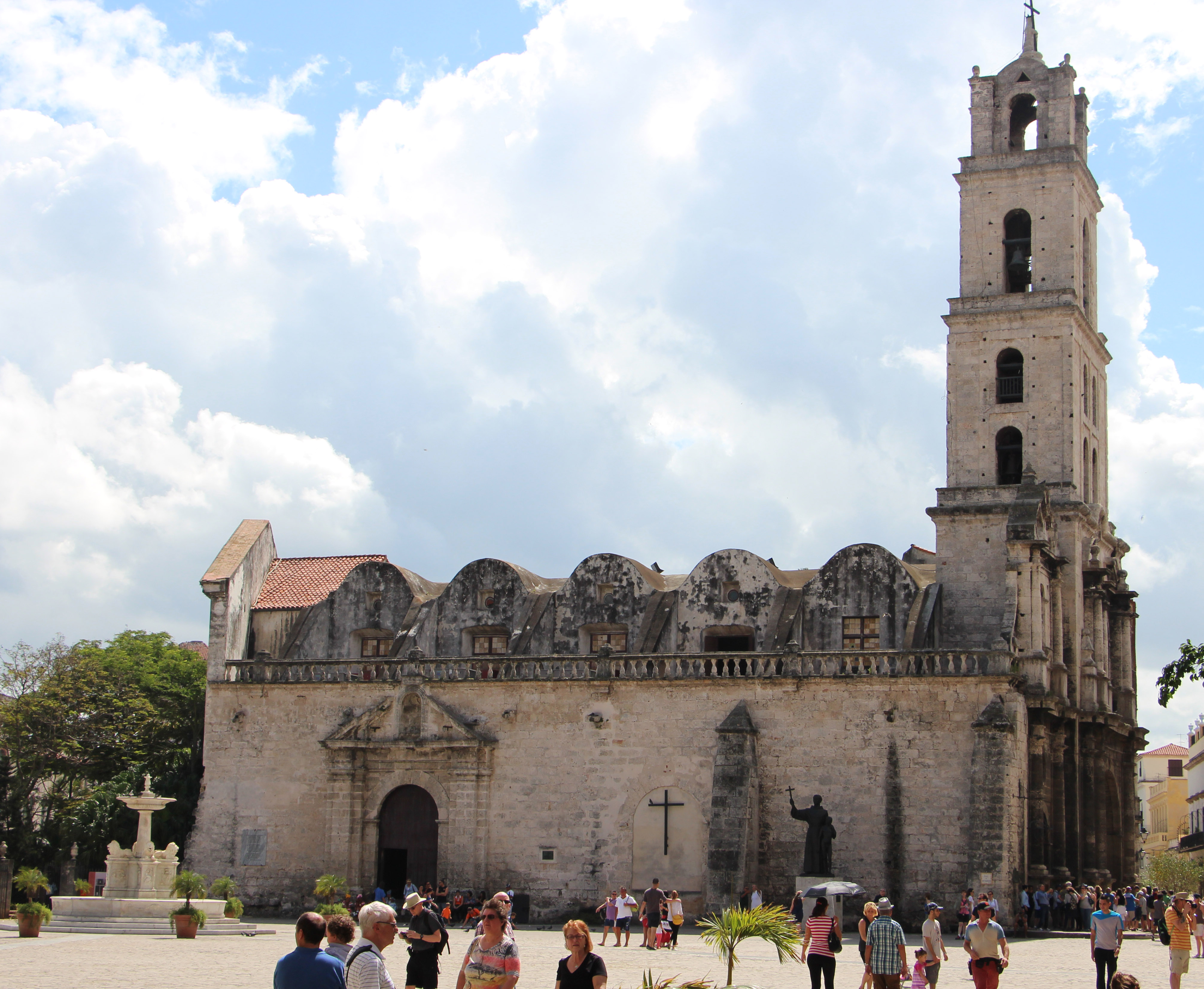
- The basilica in 2016
- Interactive map of the Basílica Menor de San Francisco de Asís area

General information
- Status: Active
- Type: Catholic church
- Architectural style: Baroque
- Location: Havana, Cuba
- Coordinates: 23°08′13″N 82°20′54″W

Height
- Height: 42 metres (138 ft)

The Basílica Menor of San Francisco de Asís (English: Minor Basilica of Saint Francis of Assisi; also the Convento de San Francisco de Asis) is a Catholic minor basilica and Franciscan convent in the district of Old Havana, Cuba. Its construction began in 1548 and lasted until 1591, although it was inaugurated in 1575, it was badly damaged by storms in 1680 and 1692, and by a hurricane that broke down its tower in 1694. Started in its current form in 1716, it was completely completed almost 200 years later, with a series of structural reforms from 1731 to 1738. In 1842, it became the General Post Office and headquarters of the Post Office of Cuba, and later acted as a government office for several other departments.

== Public square ==
Plaza de San Francisco de Asís (Saint Francis of Assisi Square) is a public square in the district of Old Havana, Havana, Cuba. Founded on 2 June 1628, it is one of the oldest squares in Havana. It is named after the nearby Convento de San Francisco de Asís, a Franciscan convent built between 1575 and 1591. The iconic Fuente de los Leones, built by Italian sculptor Giuseppe Gaggini, was installed in 1836.

In 1761, José Martín Félix de Arrate, Mayor of Havana, considered the plaza to be the best place in the city. Both the city hall (casas capitulares), police house, jailhouse and customs office faced the plaza at the time. The Basílica Menor of San Francisco de Asís (Minor Basilica of Saint Francis of Assisi) is a Franciscan convent in the district of Old Havana, Cuba. Its construction began in 1548 and lasted until 1591, although it was inaugurated in 1575, it was damaged by storms in 1680 and 1692, and by a hurricane that broke down its tower in 1694. It began in its current form in 1716, and completed 200 years later with a series of structural reforms from 1731 to 1738.

=== Painting by Dominic Serres ===
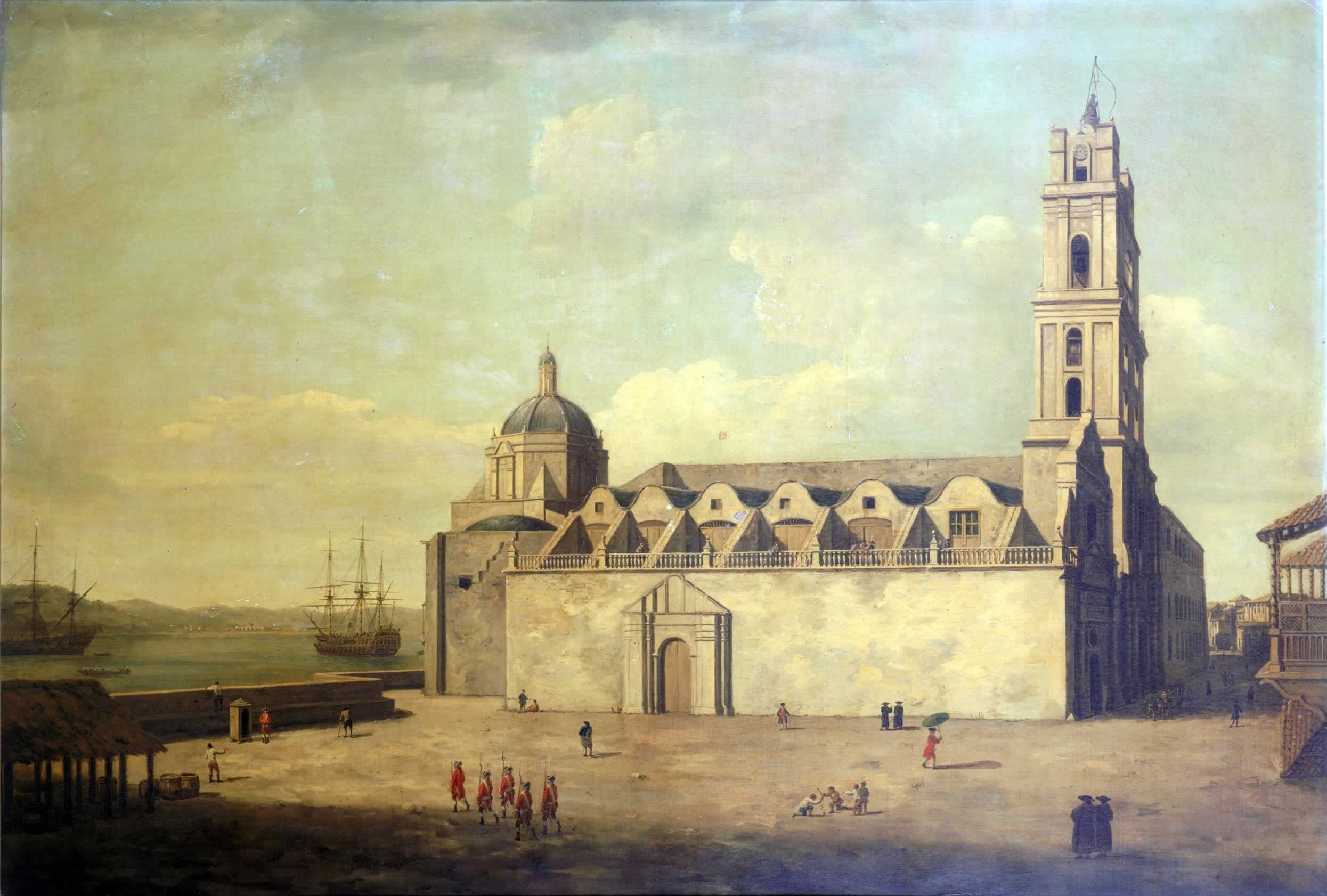
Painting of the Basilica of San Francisco de Asís in 1770 by Dominic Serres.

One of a series of 11 painting completed by Dominic Serres for the Keppel family of the capture of Havana, the last major operation of the Seven Years' War, 1756–63. It was part of Great Britain's offensive against Spain when she entered the war in support of France late in 1761. The British government's response was immediately to plan large offensive amphibious operations against Spanish overseas possessions, particularly Havana, the capital of the western dominions and Manila, the capital of the eastern. Havana needed large forces for its capture and early in 1762 ships and troops were dispatched under Admiral Sir George Pocock and General the Earl of Albemarle. The force which descended on Cuba consisted of 22 ships of the line, four 50-gun ships, three 40-gunners, a dozen frigates and a dozen sloops and bomb vessels. In addition there were troopships, storeships, and hospital ships. Pocock took this great fleet of about 180 sail through the dangerous Old Straits of Bahama, from Jamaica, to take Havana by surprise. This painting comes towards the end of the chronological sequence of the series, once Havana has been captured and occupied by the British. The focus of the composition is the magnificent late colonial Baroque architecture of the church of San Francisco de Asís. Despite the received title of the painting, this was not the cathedral of Havana, but a monastic church dating from the 1730s. Serres treats the subject in the conventional manner of a European topographical cityscape, but inserts conspicuous details indicating the context of conflict and the colonial setting. So, red-coated troops exercise in the square, and a sentry stands guard outside his box, across from black-robed figures of Spanish Catholic clerics and alongside a group of self-absorbed boys at play. On the far side of the square another red-coated European strides with his parasol to protect him from the burning tropical sun, while in the harbour beyond the dome of the church sit British warships at anchor.

=== British occupation ===
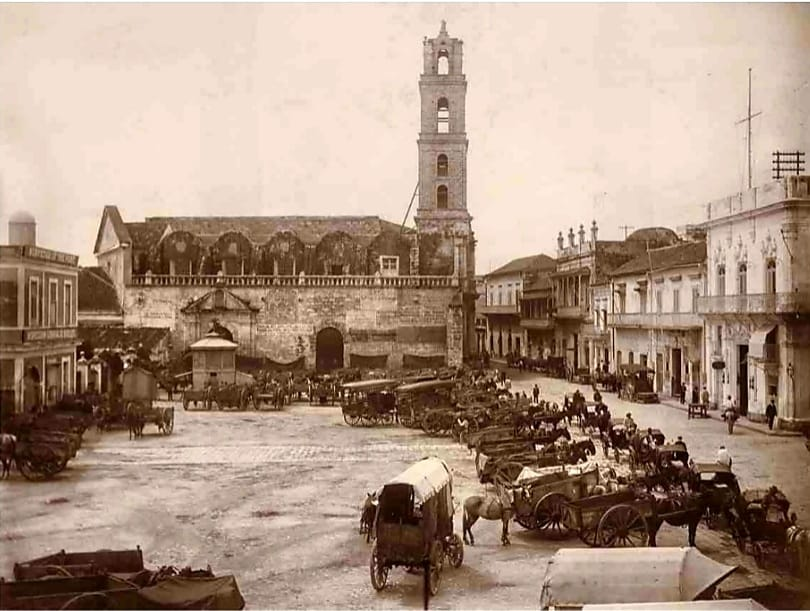
Minor Basilica of San Francisco de Asís in 1902.

The basilica was used by the British for their worship during the year in which they ruled Havana. The Siege of Havana was a military action that lasted from March to August 1762, and was a part of the Seven Years' War. British forces besieged and captured the city of Havana, which at the time was an important Spanish naval base, the British dealt a serious blow to the Spanish Navy. Havana was subsequently returned to Spain under the 1763 Treaty of Paris that formally ended the war. When it returned to Spanish rule, they chose not to use it as a church. It is now used for concerts. Attached to the basilica is a bell tower (138-ft). Originally a statue of St. Francis of Assisi stood on the top of the bell tower but it was destroyed by a cyclone in 1846. Today a statue of Fray Junípero Serra with Juaneño Indian boy stands next to the basilica.

== Architecture ==
=== Facade ===
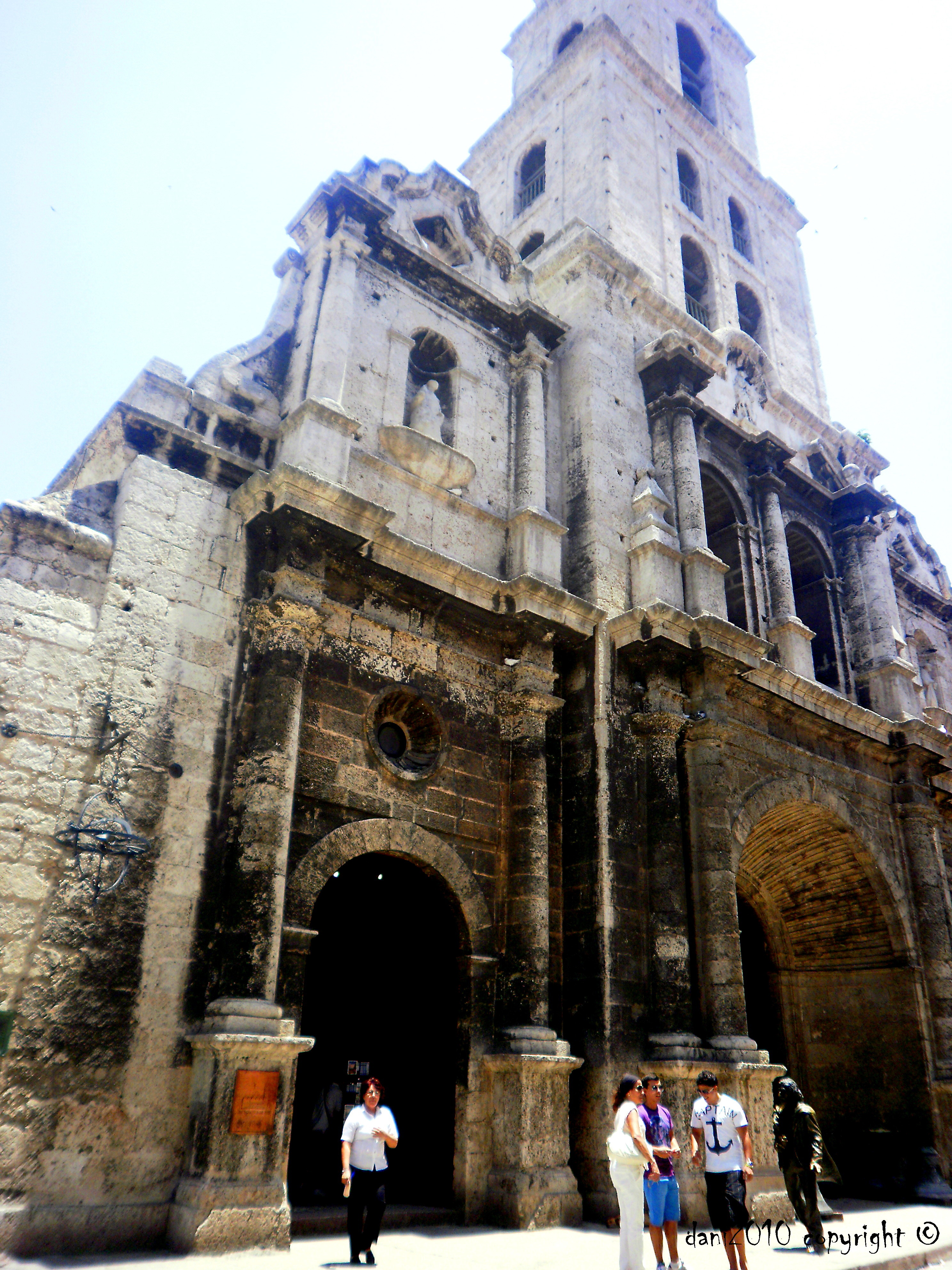
Partial front elevation.

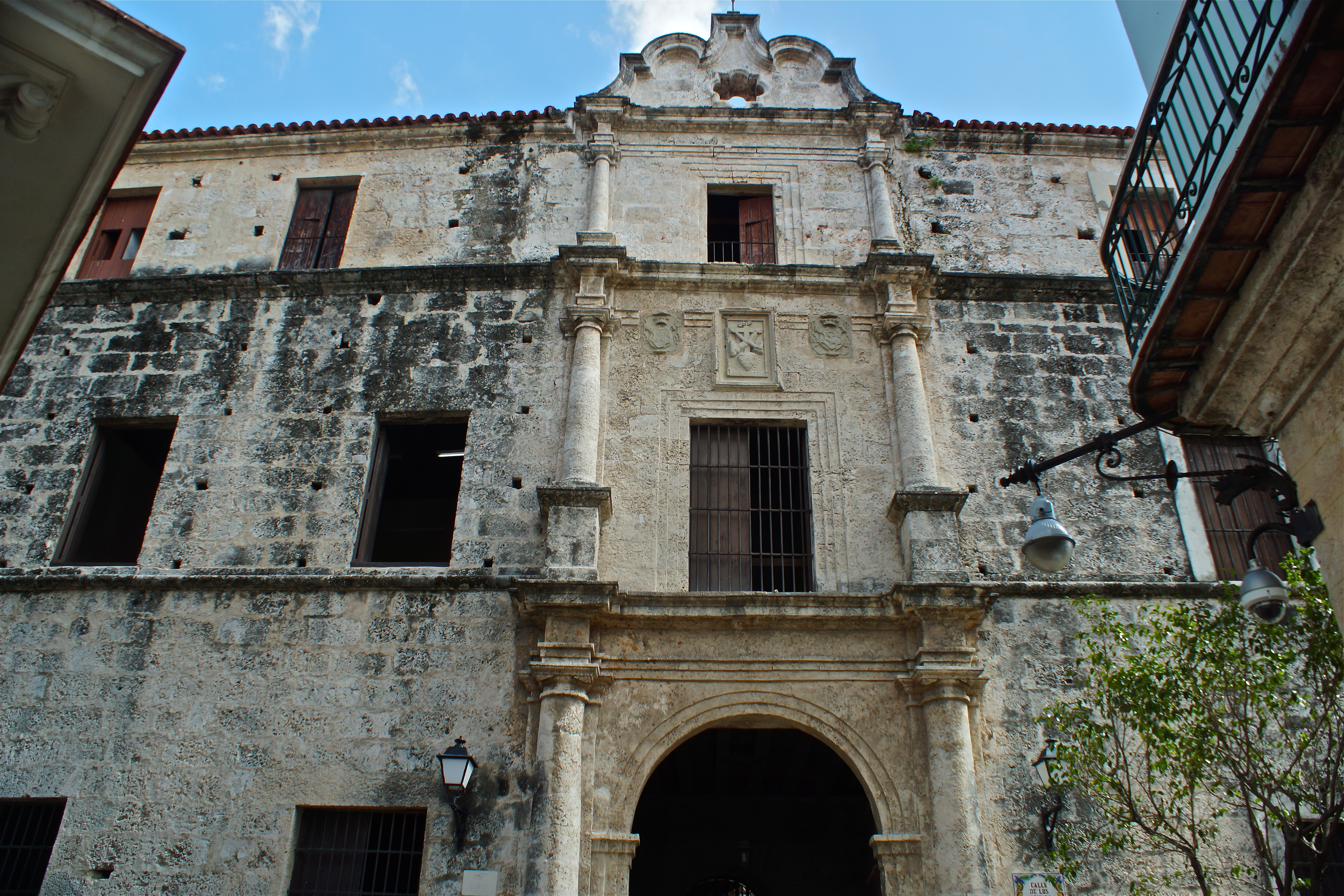

The facade is located in the Calle Oficios where three stone statues representing the Immaculate Conception, Francis of Assisi and Saint Dominic. It attained its current status of minor basilica in 1739. The adjacent Plaza de San Francisco de Asís was inaugurated in 1628. Along with the rest of Old Havana, it is a UNESCO World Heritage Site since 1982.

=== Cloister ===
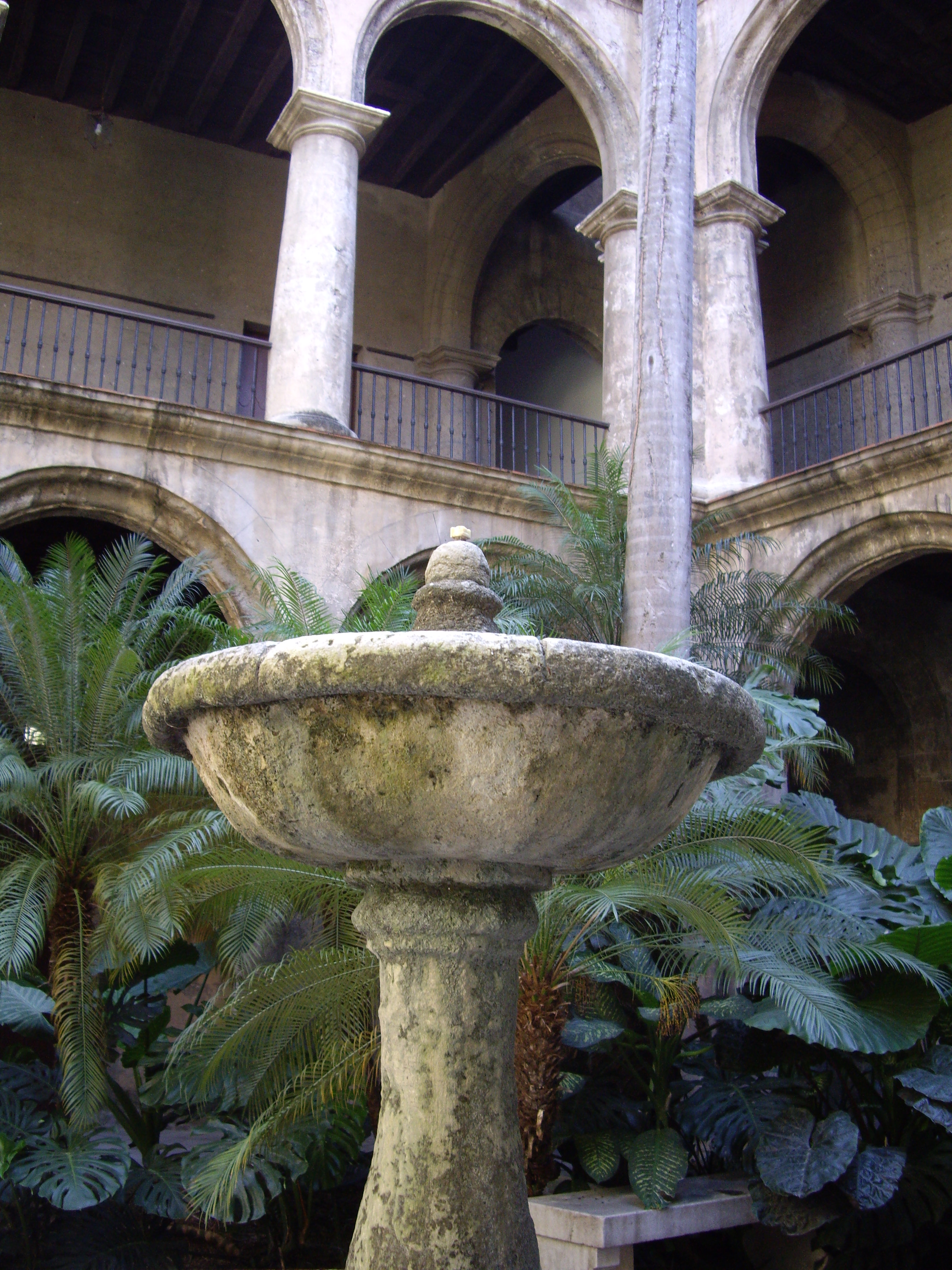
Cloister, Basílica Menor de San Francisco de Asís.

The cloister of the adjacent monastery which dates back to 1739 now houses a museum of sacred art. In front of the basilica on the sidewalk stands a bronze life-size statue by Jose Villa Soberon of José María López Lledín known as El Caballero de Paris (1899–1985) is buried inside the basilica.

== See also ==
- Plaza Vieja, Havana
- José María López Lledín
- Iglesia del Espíritu Santo, Havana
- Iglesia de San Francisco de Paula, Havana
- Iglesia Santo Cristo del Buen Viaje, Havana
- Havana Cathedral

== Gallery ==
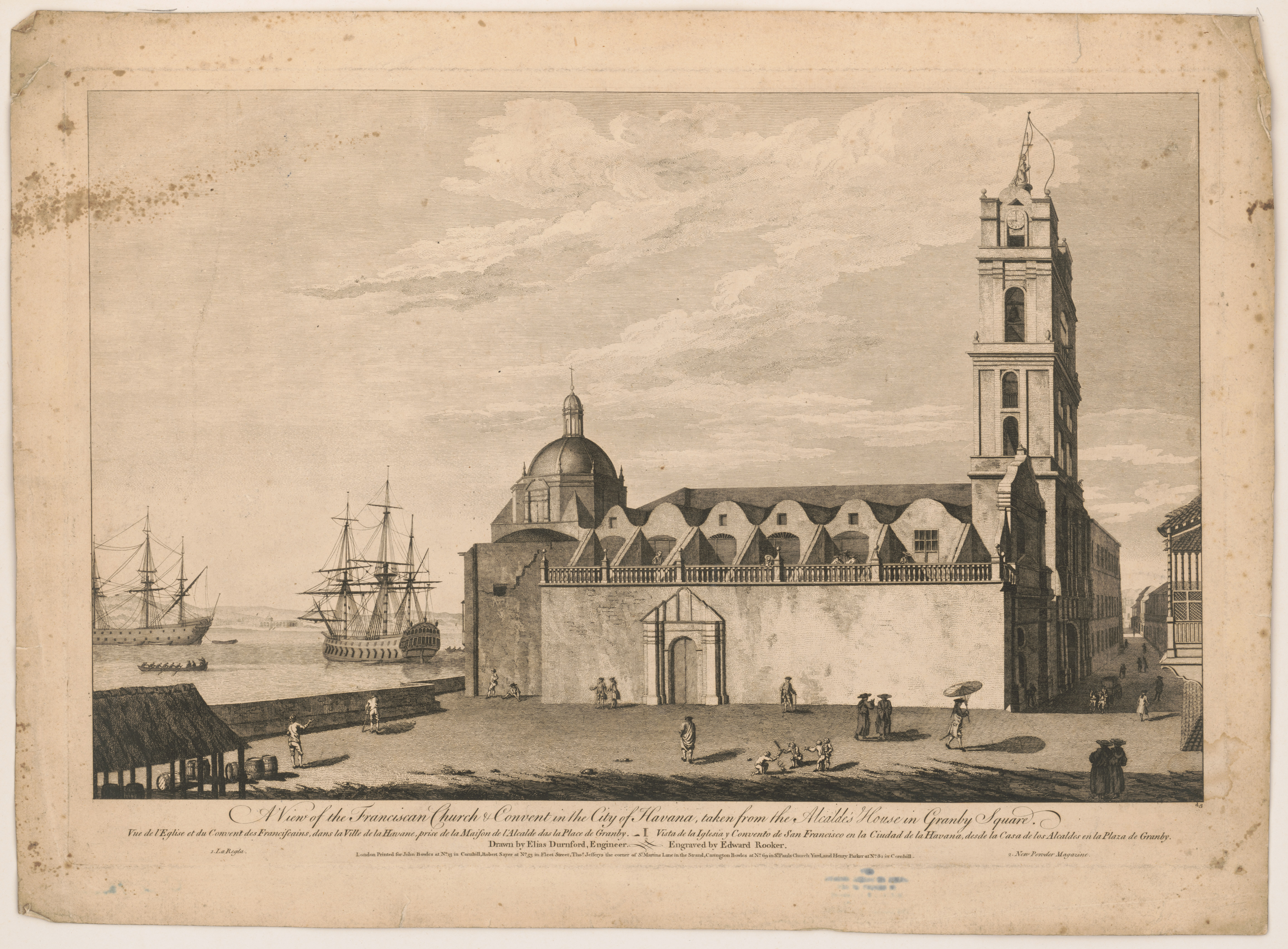
A view of the Franciscan convent in the city of Havana, taken from the alcalde's house in Granby Square, circa 1768, Library of Congress

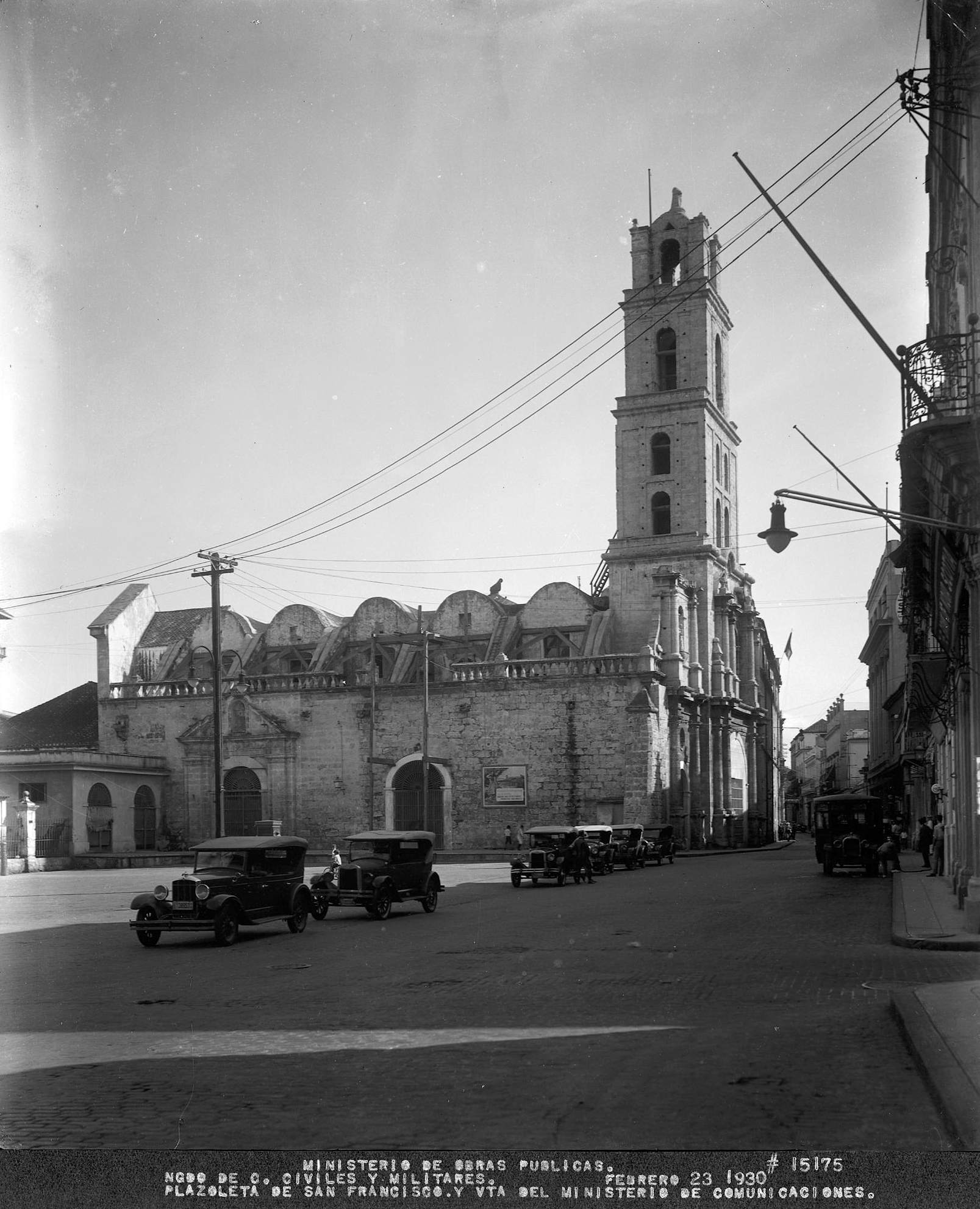

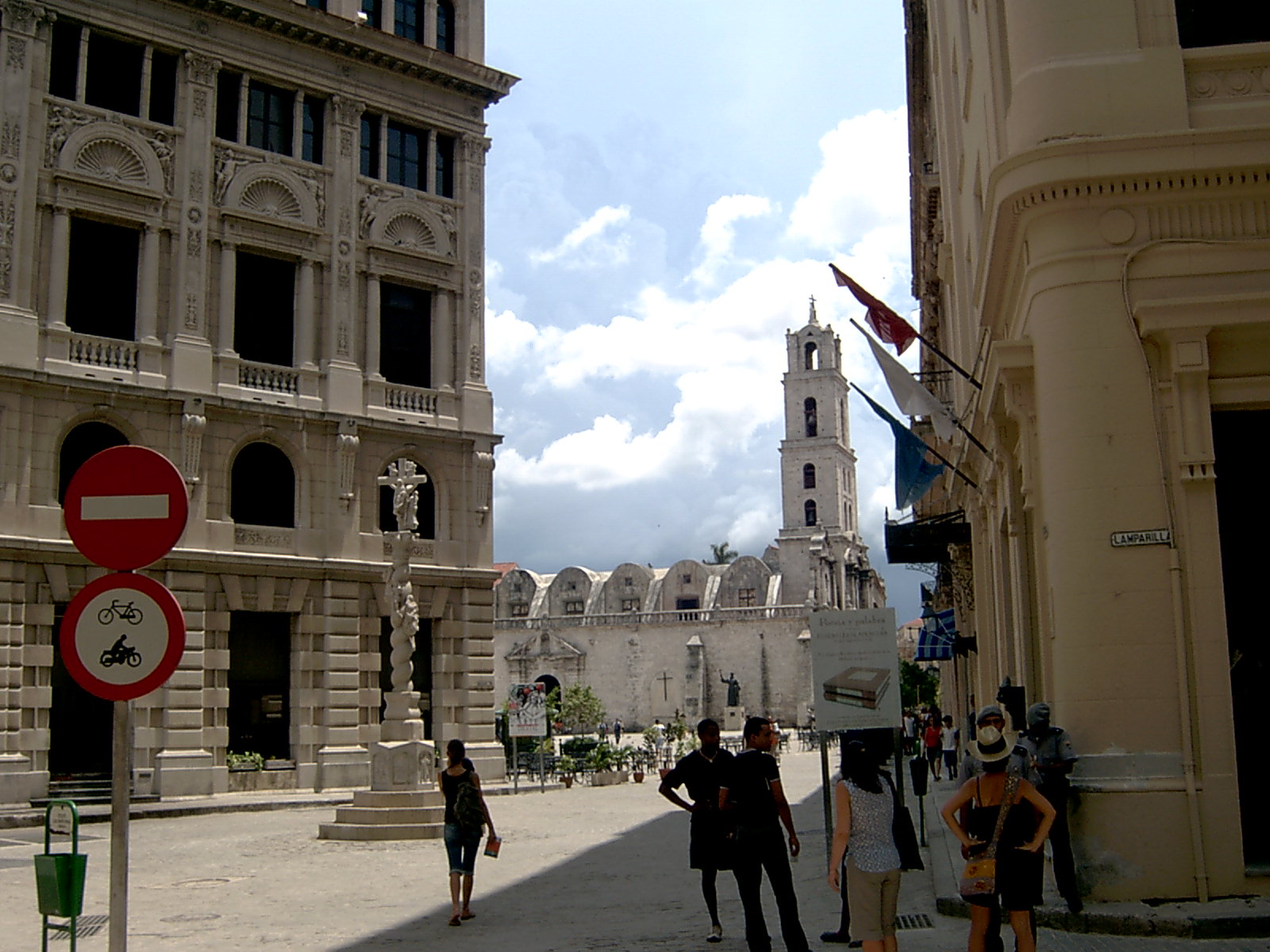

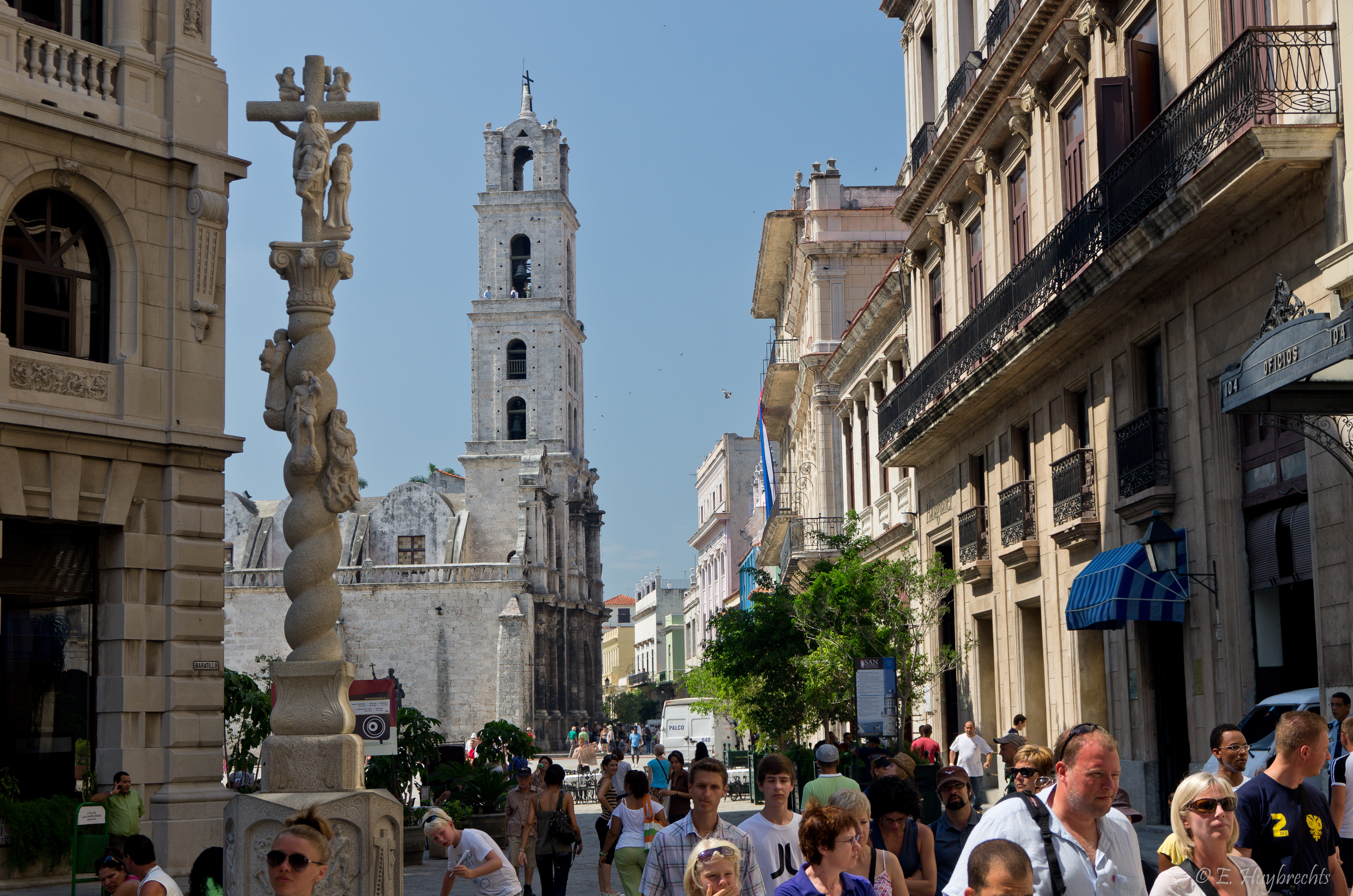

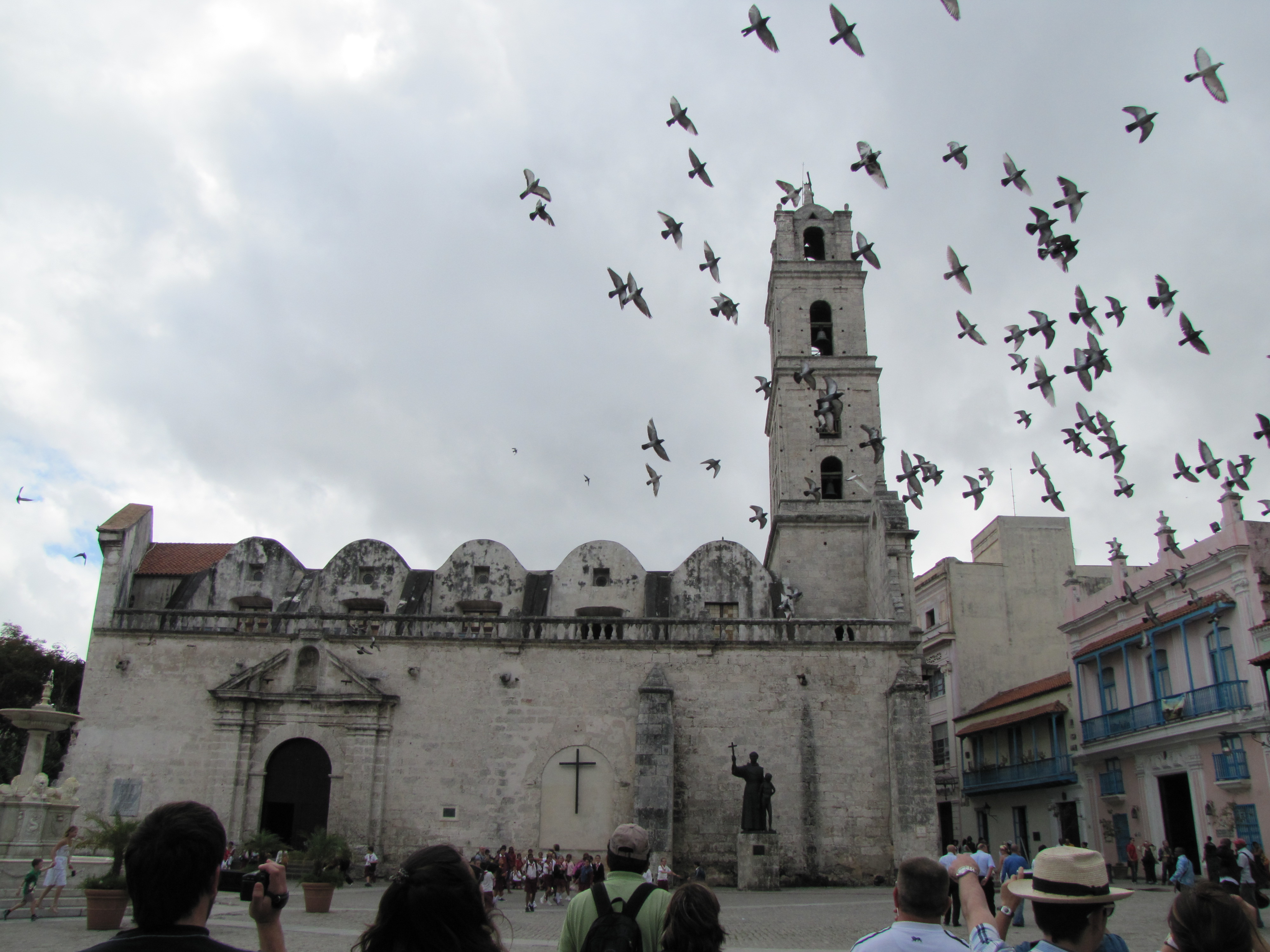

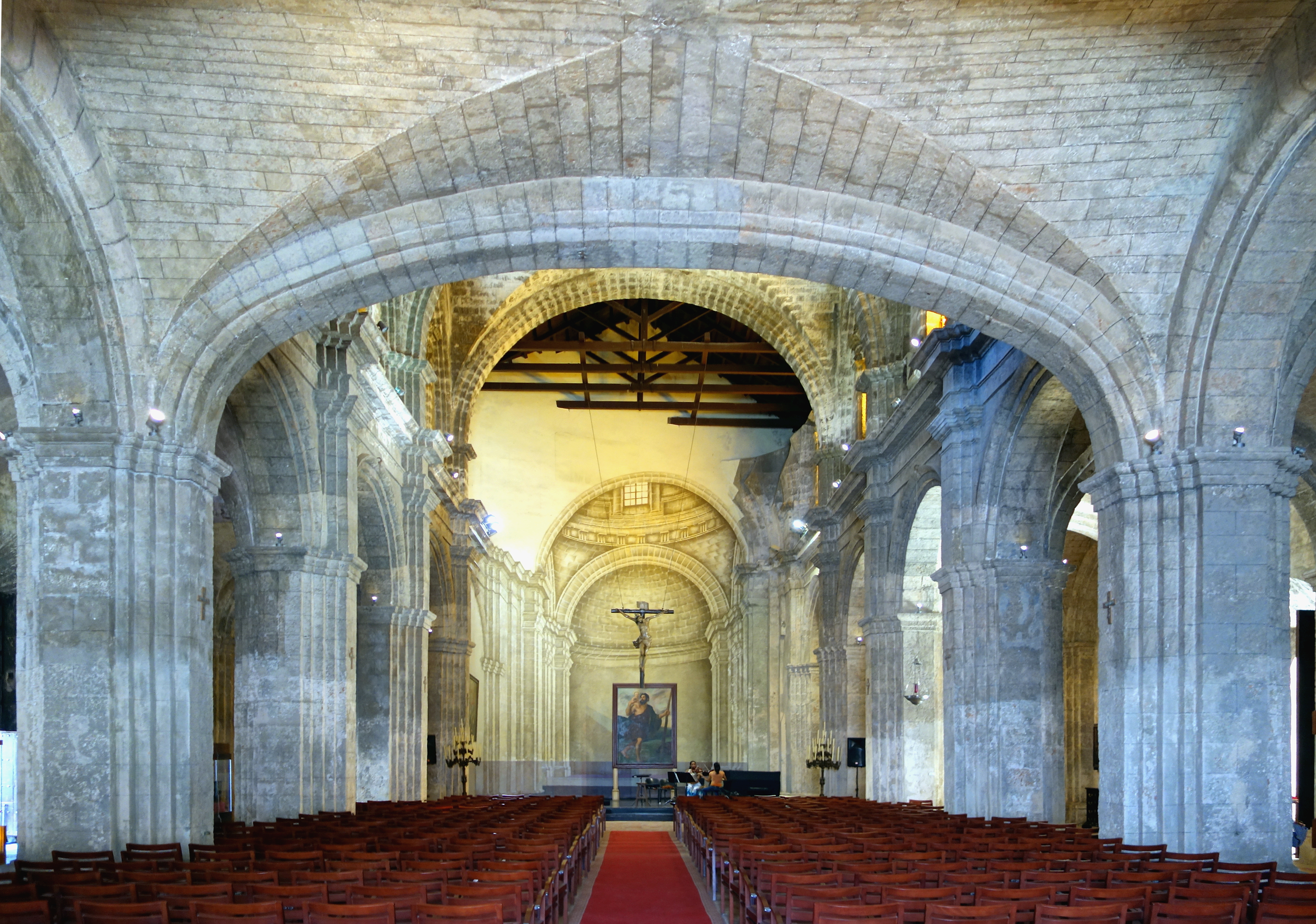
Interior of the basilica

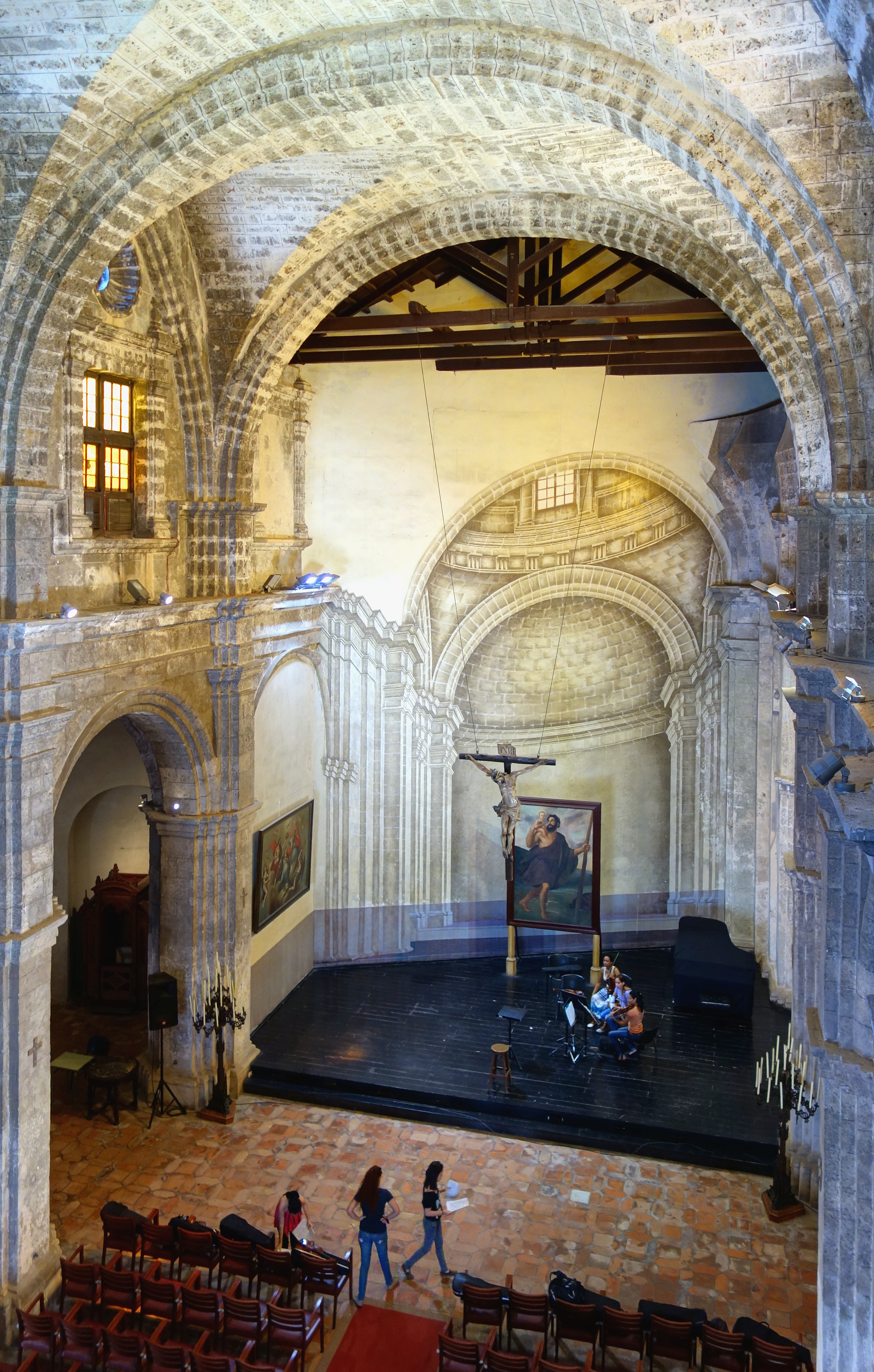

== See also ==
- List of buildings in Havana
