= Church Santo Cristo del Buen Viaje, Havana =

Iglesia Santo Cristo del Buen Viaje
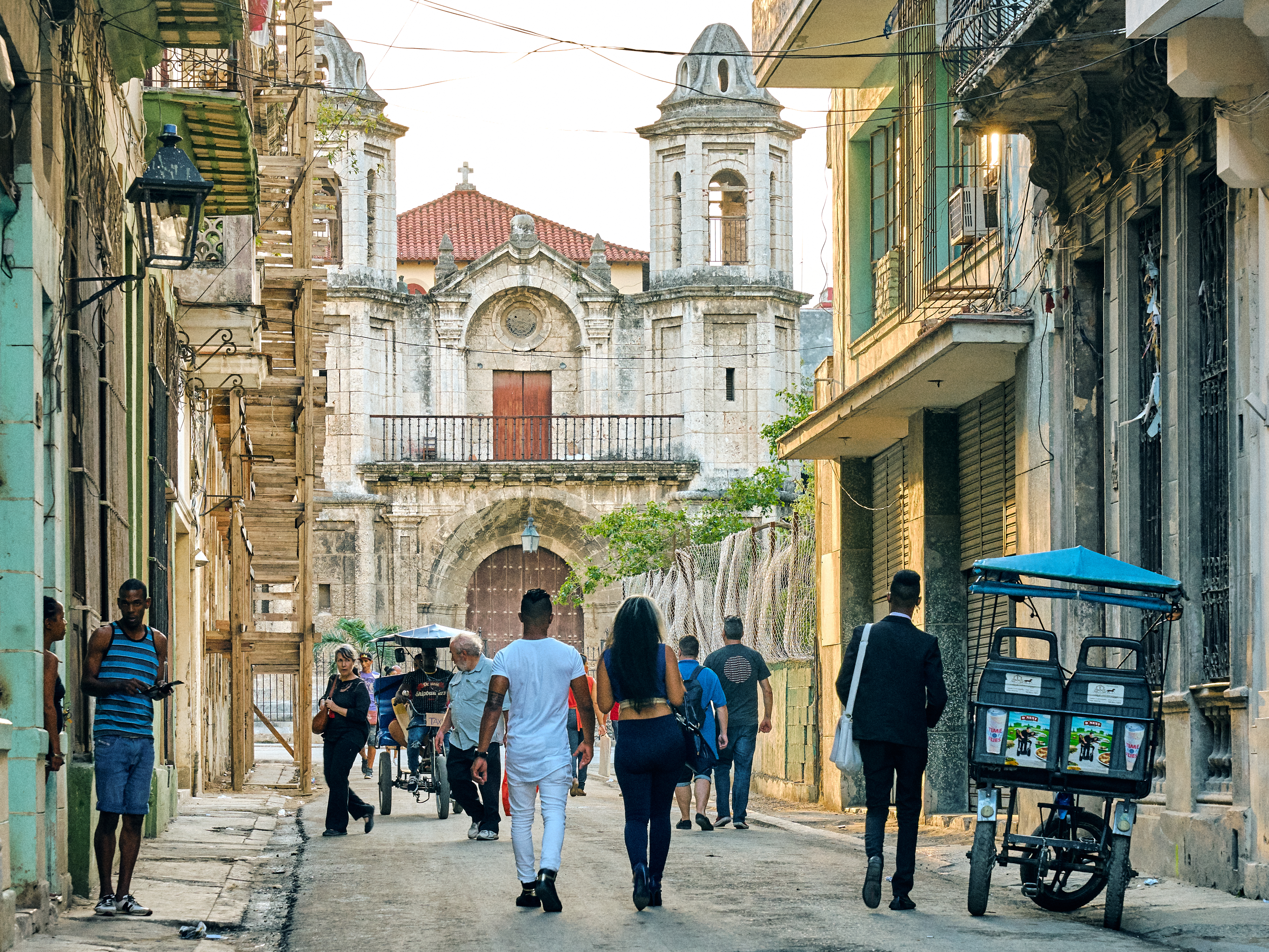
- Church Santo Cristo del Buen Viaje, photo of 2017
- Interactive map of the Iglesia Santo Cristo del Buen Viaje area

General information
- Type: Religious
- Architectural style: cruciform plan
- Location: Havana, Cuba, Havana, Cuba
- Coordinates: 23°08′10″N 82°21′22″W
- Completed: 1648

Technical details
- Material: Coral stone, wood, wood panel ceiling
- Floor count: 1

Renovating team
- Architects: Leonardo Morales y Pedroso, 1926 Renovation

Website
- http://www.iglesiadelsantocristo.org/

The Iglesia del Santo Cristo del Buen Viaje is located in Old Havana, Havana on Calle Cristo between Calles Lamparilla y Teniente Rey. Built at a time in which transatlantic crossings were risky, it acquired popularity during colonial times as a temple dedicated to travelers and navigators. Travelers and especially sailors would visit before leaving on a journey, and to pay their respects upon arriving back on land. Later during Cuba's republican era, the devotion to Saint Rita was added to the church.

== History ==
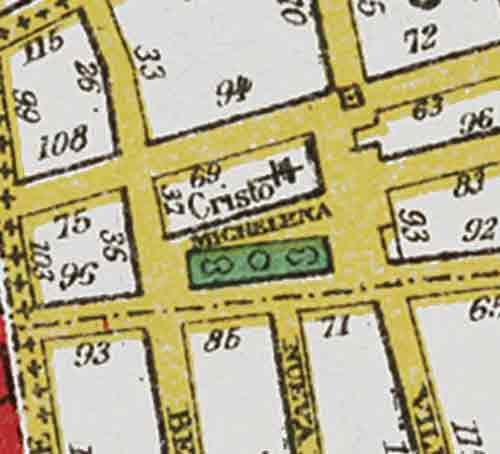
Corridor of Michelena showing Parque Cristo across the church.

In the place that today occupies the church, in 1604 the congregants of the Third Franciscan Order, erected a modest hermitage called "Ermita del Humilladera" and had as its function the twelfth or final station of the Via Crucis. This ceremony started from the Convento de San Francisco and crossed the city from east to west along Calle de Las Cruces or Calle de la Amargura. Only the enclosure and cover of the central nave remain from that building.

In 1640 the current Plaza del Cristo was built next to the church, which was then known as Plaza Nueva and the chapel became Nuestra Señora del Buen Viaje, replacing the one that existed from the previous century in the neighborhood of Campeche.

In 1693 the temple was enlarged, rebuilt and converted into auxiliary of the Parochial Major Church by Bishop Diego Evelino de Compostela, who later elevated it to a parish in 1703.

In 1899 the church was given to the parishioners of the Order of San Agustín.

It was the second parish of the city, after the Iglesia del Espíritu Santo.

== Architecture ==
Iglesia Santo Cristo del Buen Viaje. Floor Plan

The Iglesia Santo Cristo del Buen Viaje is distinguished for its simplicity, symmetry and baroque façade; it is also notable for its twin hexagonal towers, the tower of the Epistle and the tower of the Gospel. The latter contains four bells, the oldest was cast in the year 1515. There is an outward flaring arch over the entryway. The nave has a Hispano Mudéjar wood ceiling and an ancient crucifix which is over three centuries old. The Iglesia Santo Cristo del Buen Viaje was the last station on the Stations of the Cross, a procession that started at the old St Francis church and proceeded to el Santo Cristo through Calle Amargura. The church and its Plaza have received penitents in need of spiritual rest and comfort for centuries.

== Plaza de las Lavanderas ==
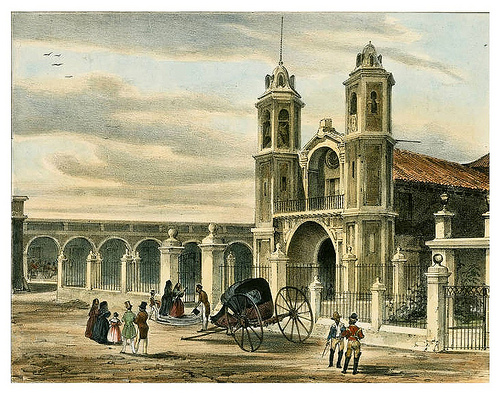
Iglesia Santo Cristo del Buen Viaje in 1839. Painting by Frédéric Mialhe.

In the mid-17-century, three blocks southeast of Parque Central and two blocks south of Calle Obispo, the small plaza takes its name from the Iglesia del Santo Cristo del Buen Viaje. Plaza del Cristo was created in 1640 when the square was first known as Plaza Nueva. The hermitage was the twelfth station of the Vía Crucis (Procession of the Cross), which took place annually during Lent and led along Calle Amargura from the Plaza de San Francisco. The Baroque Iglesia del Santo Cristo del Buen Viaje now covers the site of the old hermitage on the north-western side of the plaza. Of the original building, only the enclosure and painted wood ceiling still remain. Later, the square was briefly known as Plaza de las Lavanderas; “Plaza of the Washerwomen”, named because of the large number of Afro-Cuban washerwomen that met to attend mass.

Graham Greene's used this small plaza for the setting of his protagonist Wormold (the vacuum-cleaner salesman-secret agent) was “swallowed up among the pimps and lottery sellers of the Havana noon” in his film Our Man in Havana. Wormold and his daughter Milly lived at Lamparilla #37—a fictional address (one block west of the plaza) occupied by a small plaza.

As in most of Havana, the predominantly residential 19th-century buildings surrounding the dilapidated square have fallen into a state of disrepair, (even Wormold had sensed “a slow erosion of Havana”); several buildings have collapsed, while others threaten to do so. In 2014, a comprehensive restoration was initiated by the Eusebio Leal of the City Historian's Office.

== Gallery ==
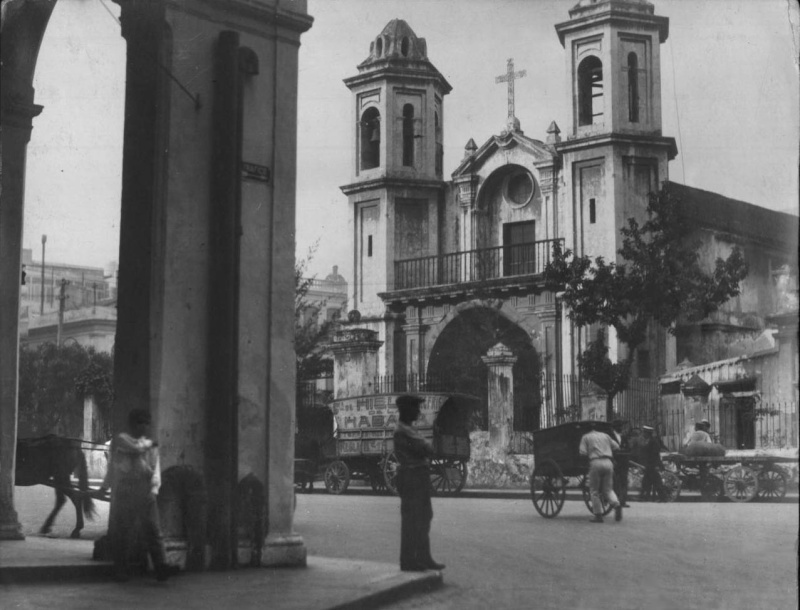
Iglesia Santo Cristo del Buen Viaje in 1930

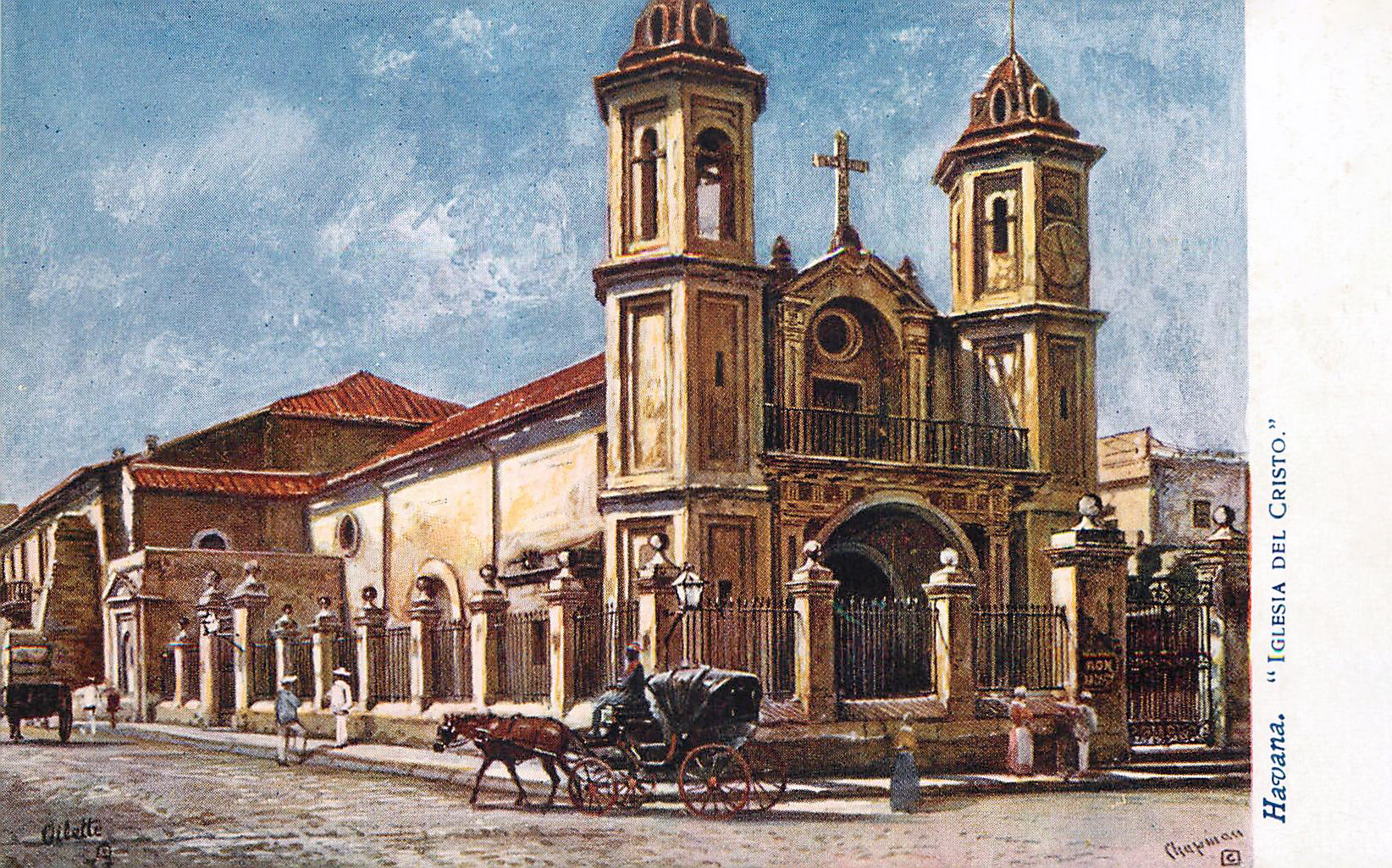
Iglesia Santo Cristo del Buen Viaje, 1908, printed in England.

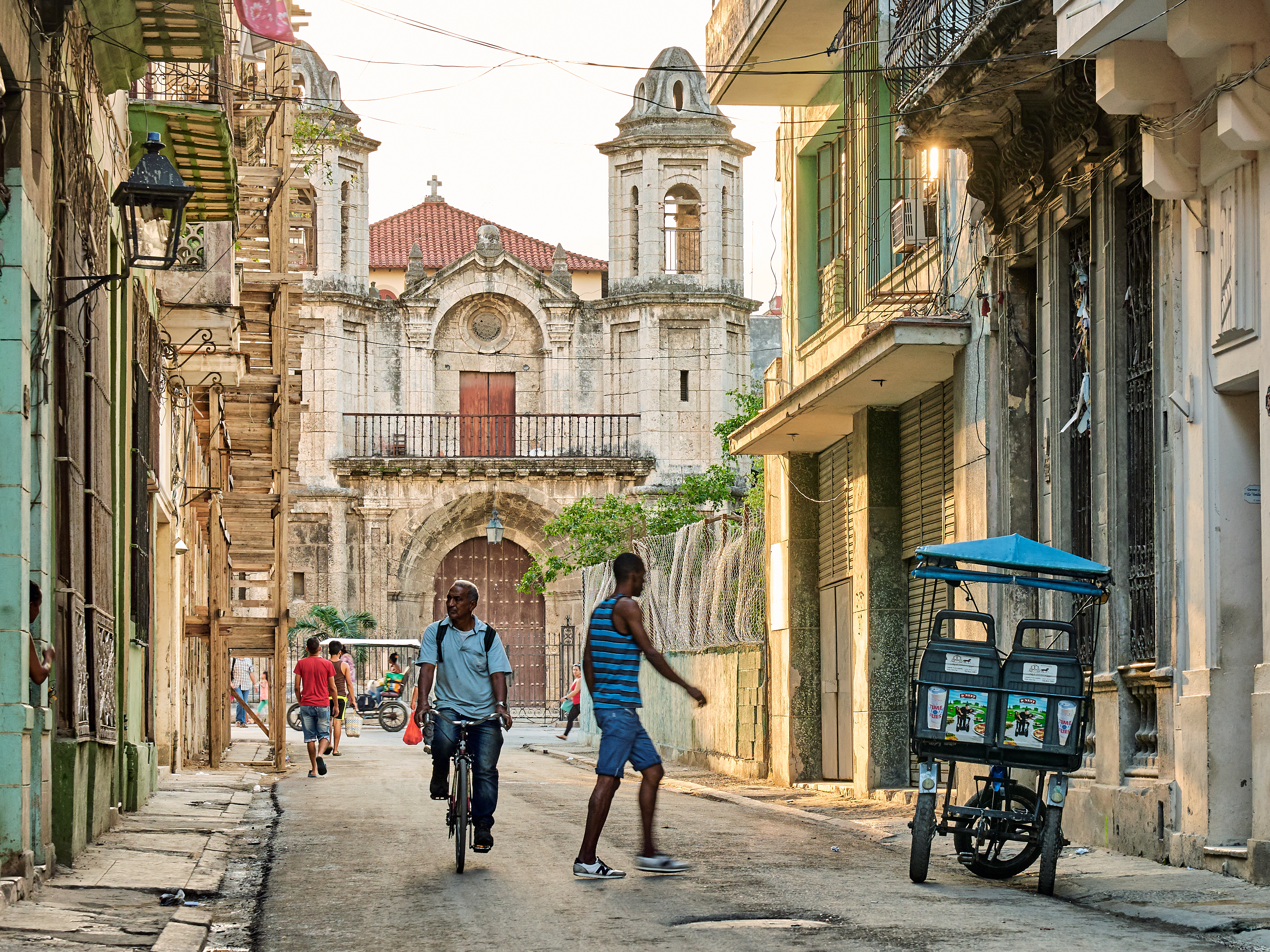
Iglesia Santo Cristo del Buen Viaje, 2017

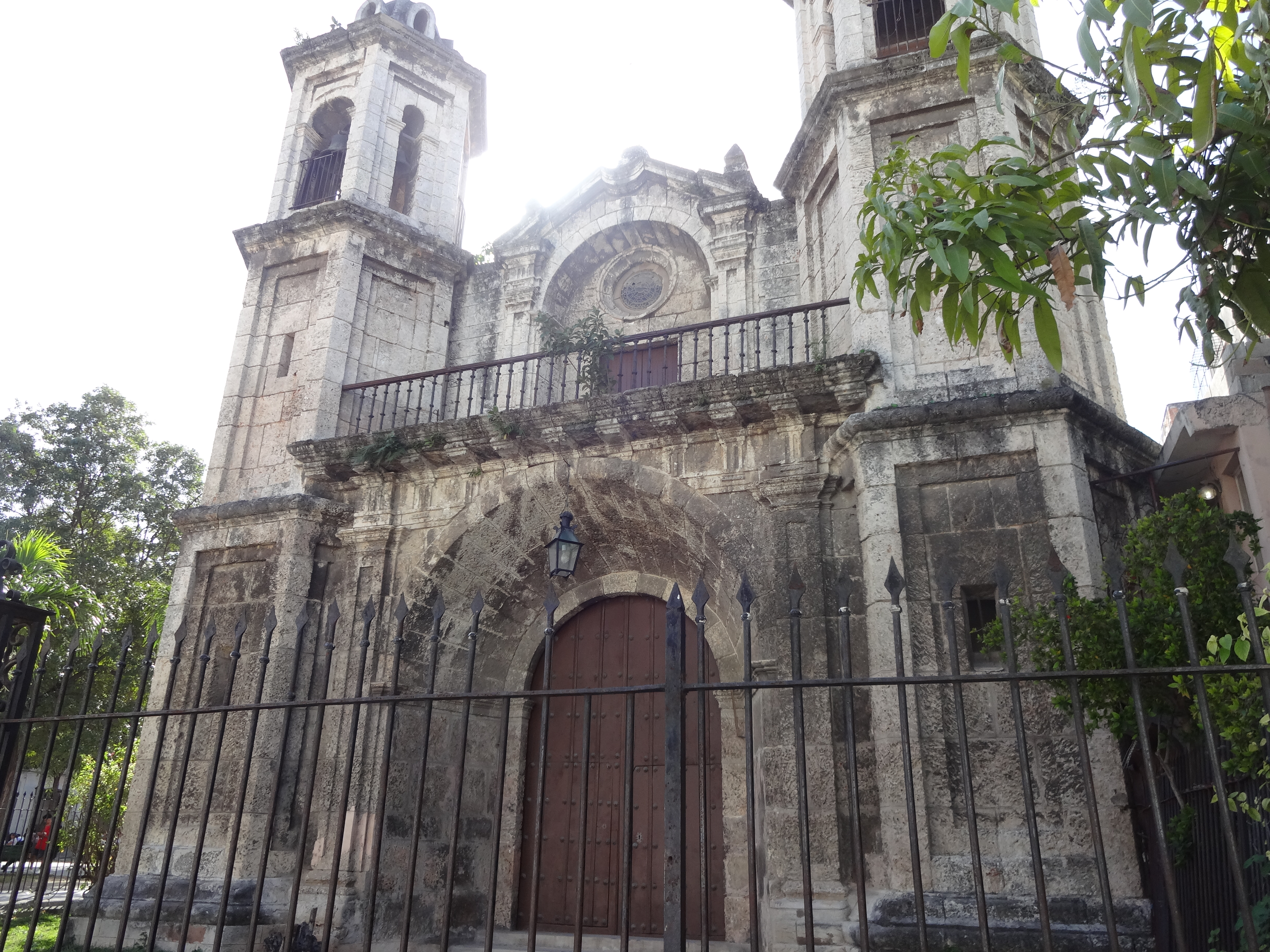
Iglesia Santo Cristo del Buen Viaje, 2018

== See also ==
- List of buildings in Havana
- Church del Espíritu Santo, Havana
- Hospital de San Lázaro, Havana
