= José María López Lledín =

Cuban street person

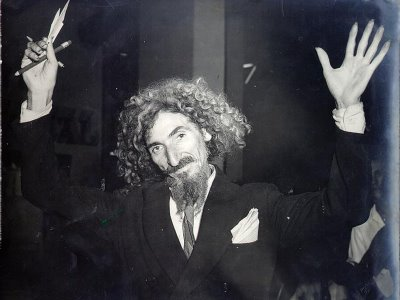
- El Caballero de Paris
- Born: 20 December 1899; A Fonsagrada, Spain
- Died: 11 July 1985 (aged 85); Havana, Cuba
- Other name: El Caballero de Paris
- Occupations: Vagabond, Havana cult figure
- Years active: Circa 1920–1985
- Known for: Walking the streets of Havana

José María López Lledín was an elegant vagabond known as El Caballero de París ("The Gentleman From Paris") who wandered the streets of Havana and was a well-known cult figure.

== Biography ==
José María, the fourth of eleven children, was born at 11 a.m. on 30 December 1899. Traveling in the German passenger ship S.S. Chemnitz, he arrived in Havana at twelve years of age on 12 December 1913. His mother was Josefa Lledín Mendes and his father was Manuel López Rodríguez; the owners of a small vineyard, they produced and sold wine and sherry. He was baptized in the Parish of Salvador de Negueira.

According to his sister Inocencia, he worked as a tailor and in a bookshop. Later he worked as a waiter in the hotels Inglaterra, Telegrafo, Sevilla, Manhattan, Royal Palm and Saratoga.

There are many stories as to why he lost his mental sanity, but all of them converge on the fact that he was imprisoned in the Castillo del Príncipe in 1920 for a crime he did not commit.

== Mental disorder ==
He was late in life diagnosed as suffering from paraphrenia, a late-onset mental disorder featuring such symptoms as delusions and hallucinations; it does not have any negative symptoms such as the deterioration of the intellect or of the personality. He was a patient of Mazorra, the Psychiatric Hospital of Havana.

== Aristocracy ==
Anybody that lived in Havana in the 1950s remembers El Caballero de París. Architect Cheo Malanga writes about the one time that he saw him:

"El Caballero de París was a cult figure in Havana in the 40s and 50s. He was of medium height, disheveled hair with some gray hair and a beard. He always wore black, with a long coat of the same color, even during the summer. He used to carry a folder full of papers. He was a gentle and educated man who roamed the streets and traveled by bus all over the city, greeting people and discussing philosophy, religion and politics. He never asked for alms or said bad words, he only accepted money from people he knew or liked.

I remember an occasion during my childhood, while I was traveling in a car with my parents on Infanta street, that my mother shouted ..... "Look, look there is El Caballero de París!" When I turned my eyes I could only see a fleeting figure with long white hair and a black cloak that slouched away at a slow pace. That was my only encounter with the Parisian aristocracy of our homeland."

== Recognitions ==
- A danzón by Antonio María Romeu, with the title "El Caballero de París" with the refrain "Mira quien viene por ahí, El Caballero de París!".
- Statue of the Gentleman of Paris. A life-size bronze figure created by the Cuban sculptor José Villa Soberón. It was placed on the pavement of the Basílica Menor de San Francisco de Asís in Old Havana, at the initiative of the Historian of the City, Eusebio Leal.

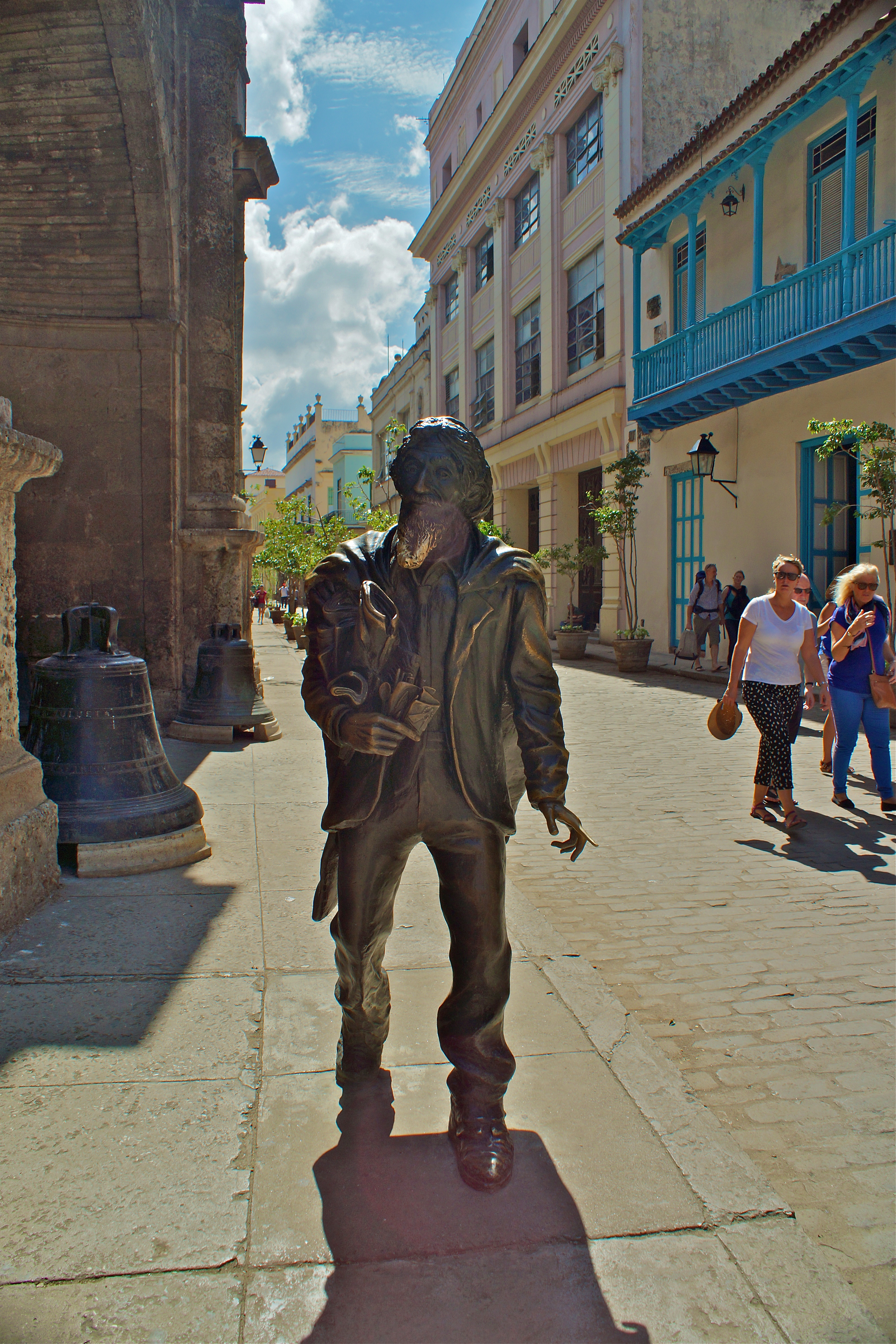
Caballero de Paris Statue, Havana, Cuba

- Documentary entitled: "Caballero de La Habana" "(the true story of the Gentleman of Paris)", which uncovers the true story of a character symbol of Havana, the Gentleman of Paris, who in reality was José María López Lledín, a native of Lugo, Galicia (©AS Video Cuba, 1998) Dir. Natasha Vázquez y Rigoberto Senarega.
- In the lyrics of the song "Cuba, qué lindo son tus paisajes" composed by Cuban musician and singer, Willy Chirino, from the album Cuba Libre (1998), the Caballero de París is mentioned.
- In 2013, Cuban singers Descemer Bueno and Kelvis Ochoa performed a musical inspired by José María López Lledín, the legendary Havana character known as "El Caballero de París", with choreography by Eduardo Blanco.

== Gallery ==
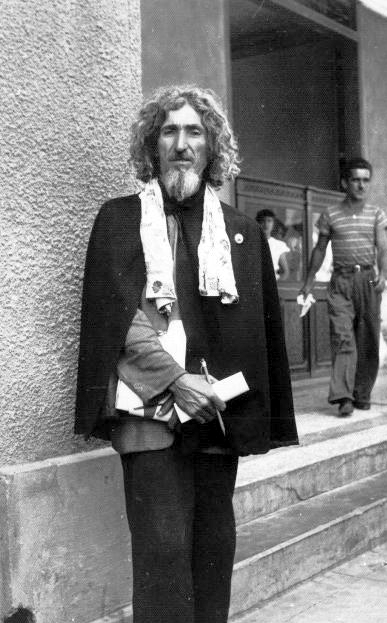
El Caballero de Paris in Havana, ca 1958.

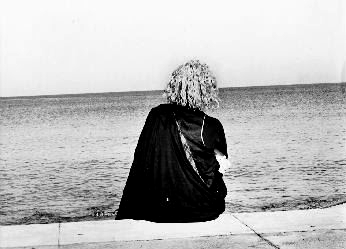
Caballero de Paris_sitting on the Malecon sea wall. Havana, Cuba

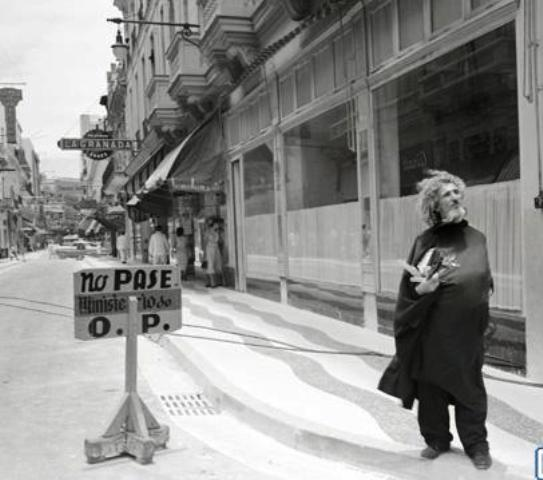
El Caballero de Paris on Calle San Rafael, Havana.
