= Old Havana =

La Habana Vieja
- First Subdivision of Havana
- Subdivisión de La Habana Vieja
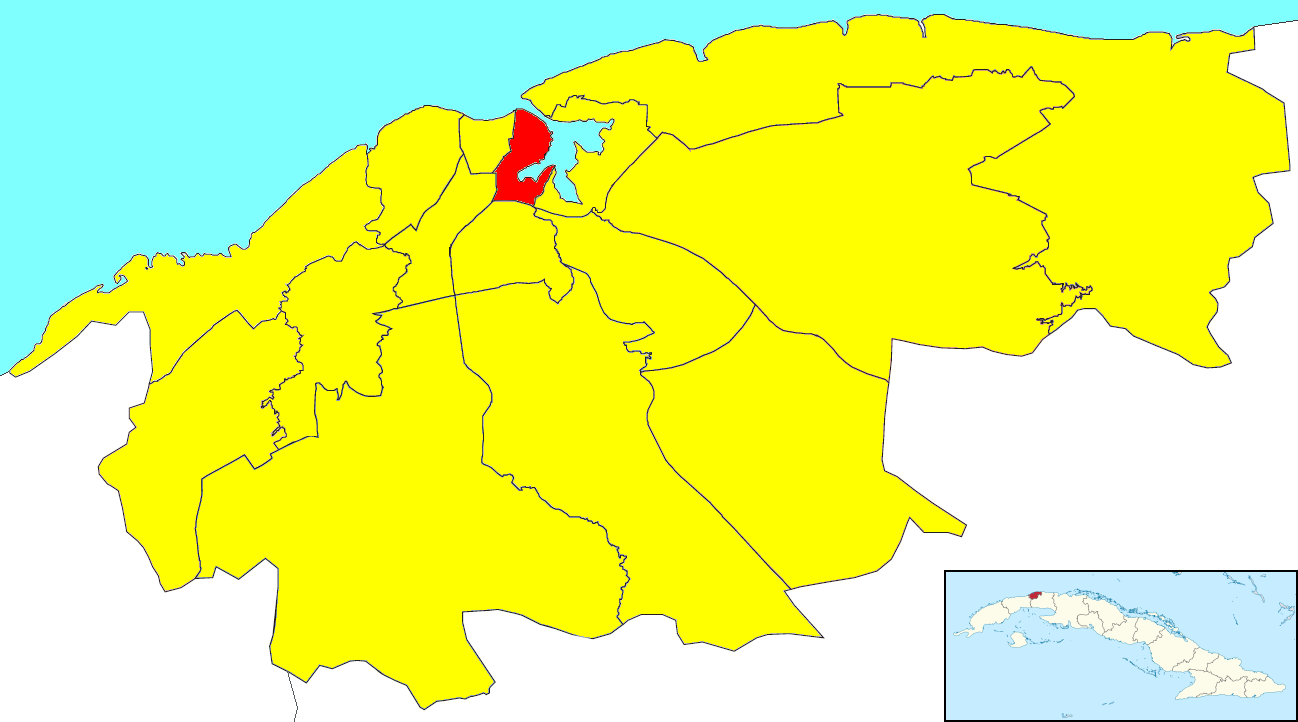
- Location of Old Havana in Havana
- Coordinates: 23°08′09.4″N 82°21′30.0″W
- Country: Cuba
- Province: Havana
- Founded: November 16, 1519
- Wards (Consejos Populares): Belén, Catedral, Jesús María, Plaza Vieja, Prado, San Isidro, Tallapiedra

Area
  - Total: 4 km^{2} (1.5 sq mi)
- Elevation: 50 m (160 ft)

Population (2022)
  - Total: 79,845
  - Density: 20,000/km^{2} (52,000/sq mi)
- Time zone: UTC-5 (EST)
- Area code: +53-7

UNESCO World Heritage Site
- Official name: Old Havana and its Fortification System
- Type: Cultural
- Criteria: iv, v
- Designated: 1982 (6th session)
- Reference no.: 204
- Contracting state: Cuba

Old Havana (Spanish: La Habana Vieja) is the city-center (downtown) and one of the 15 municipalities (or boroughs) forming Havana, Cuba. It has the second highest population density in the city and contains the core of the original city of Havana. The positions of the original Walls of Havana are the modern boundaries of Old Havana.

In 1982, Old Havana was inscribed in the UNESCO World Heritage List, because of its unique Baroque and neoclassical architecture, its fortifications, and its historical importance as a stop on the route to the New World. A safeguarding campaign was launched a year later to restore the authentic character of the buildings.

== History ==
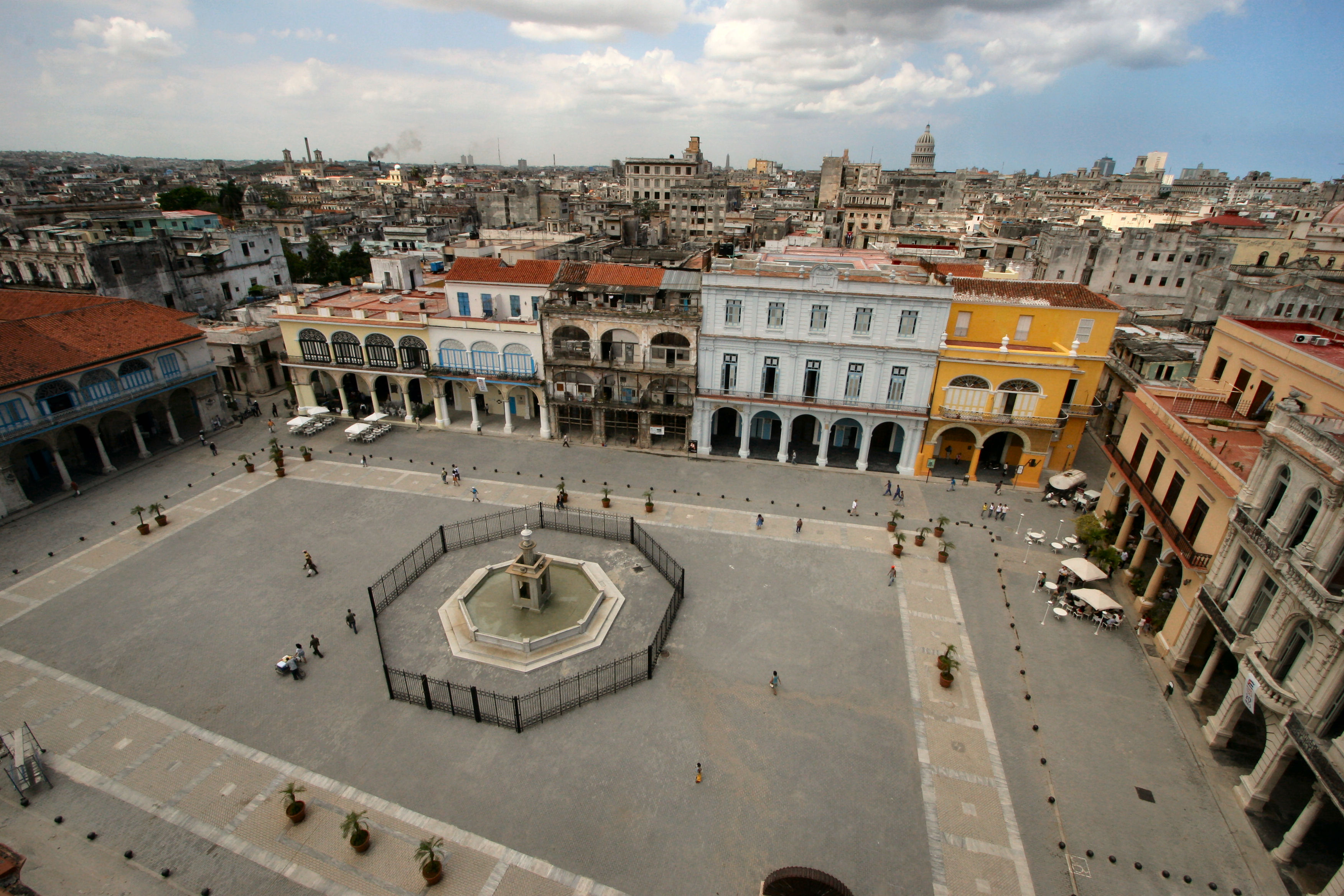
Plaza Vieja

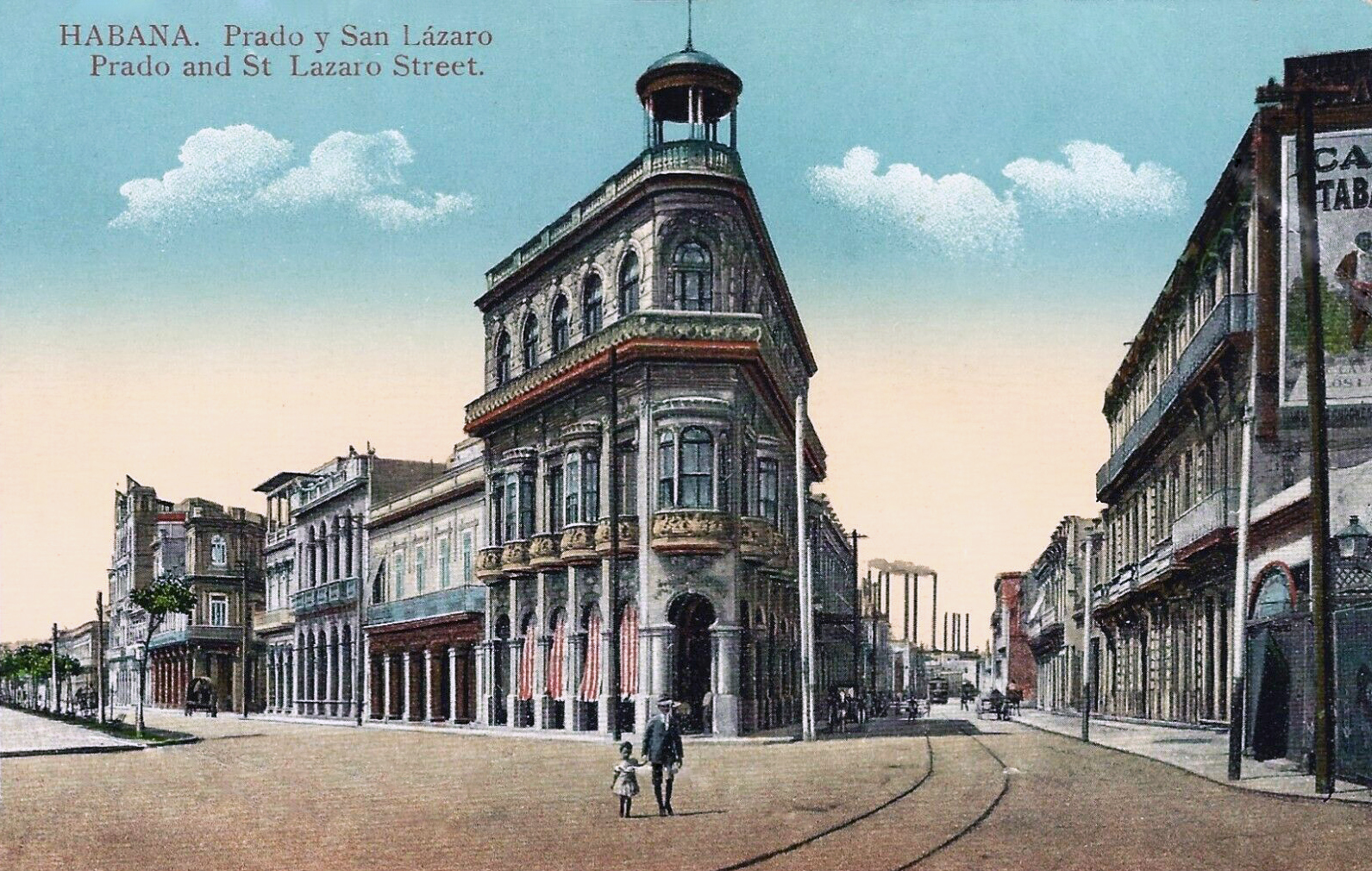
Prado and San Lázaro, Havana, postcard of 1915

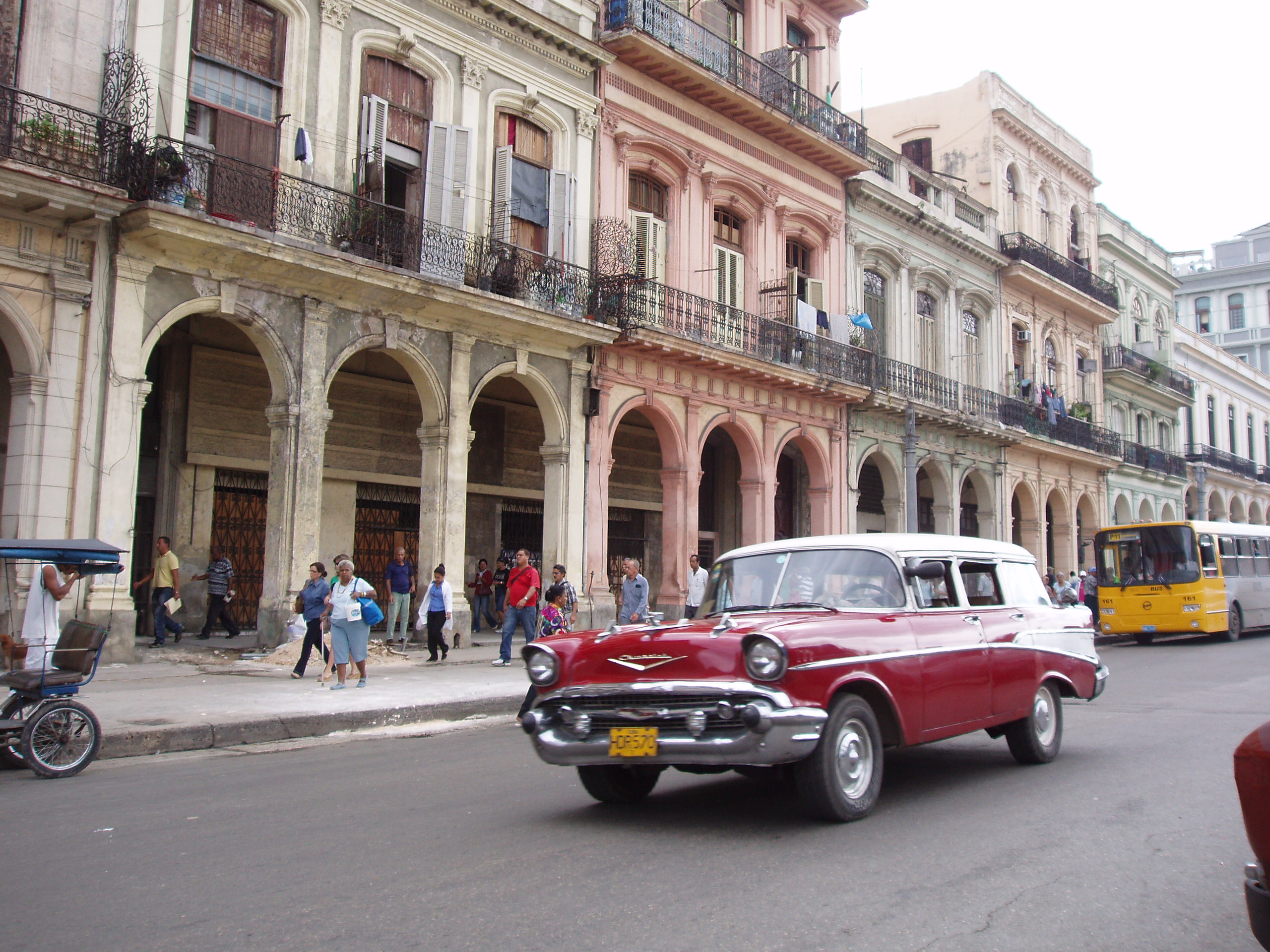
Colonial era houses in Old Havana

Havana was founded by the Spanish November 16, 1519 in the natural harbor of the Bay of Havana. It became a stopping point for the treasure laden Spanish galleons on the crossing between the New World and the Old World. In the 17th century, it was one of the main shipbuilding centers. The city was built in baroque and neoclassical styles. Many buildings have fallen into ruin in the latter half of the 20th century, but a number are being restored. The narrow streets of Old Havana contain many buildings, accounting for perhaps as many as one-third of the approximately 3,000 buildings found in Old Havana. It is the ancient city formed from the port, the official center and the Plaza de Armas.

In 1555, Old Havana was destroyed by the French corsair Jacques de Sores. The pirate had taken Havana easily, overpowering the few defenders, plundering the city, and burning much of it to the ground, but he left without obtaining the enormous wealth that he had been hoping to find there. After the incident, the Spanish brought soldiers into the city and built fortresses and walls to protect it. Construction of Castillo de la Real Fuerza, the first fortress built, was begun in 1558, and was overseen by engineer Bartolomé Sanchez.

Old Havana resembles Cádiz and Tenerife. Alejo Carpentier called it "de las columnas" (of the columns), but it could also be named for the gateways, the revoco, the deterioration and the rescue, the intimacy, the shade, the cool, the courtyards... In her there are all the big ancient monuments, the forts, the convents and churches, the palaces, the alleys, the arcade, the human density. The Cuban State had undertaken enormous efforts to preserve and to restore Old Havana through the efforts of the Office of the Historian of the City, which was directed by Eusebio Leal. The restoration effort successfully transformed Old Havana into a tourist attraction, and also resulted in Leal becoming recognized as Old Havana's de facto Mayor.

== Main sights ==
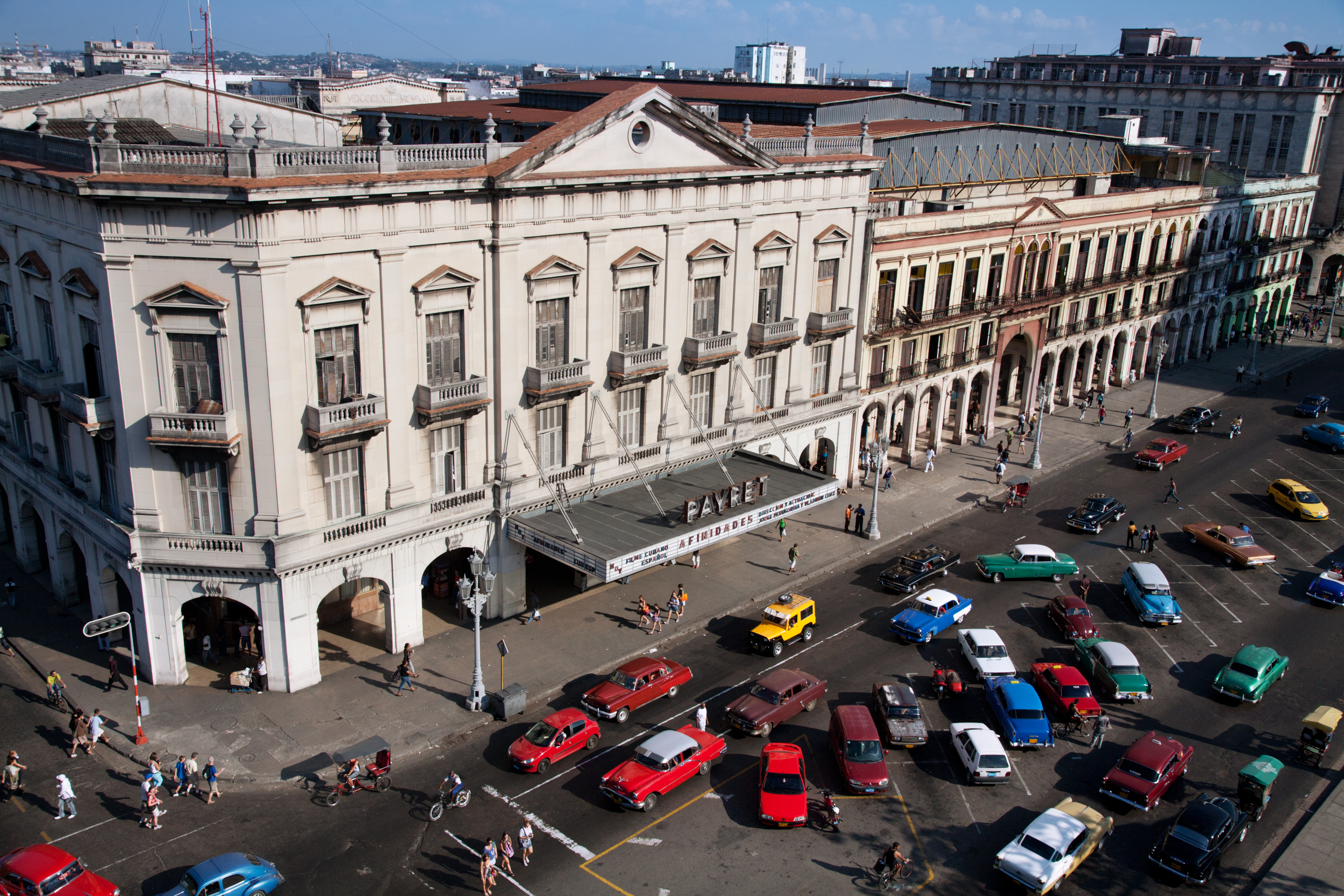
Payret Cinema

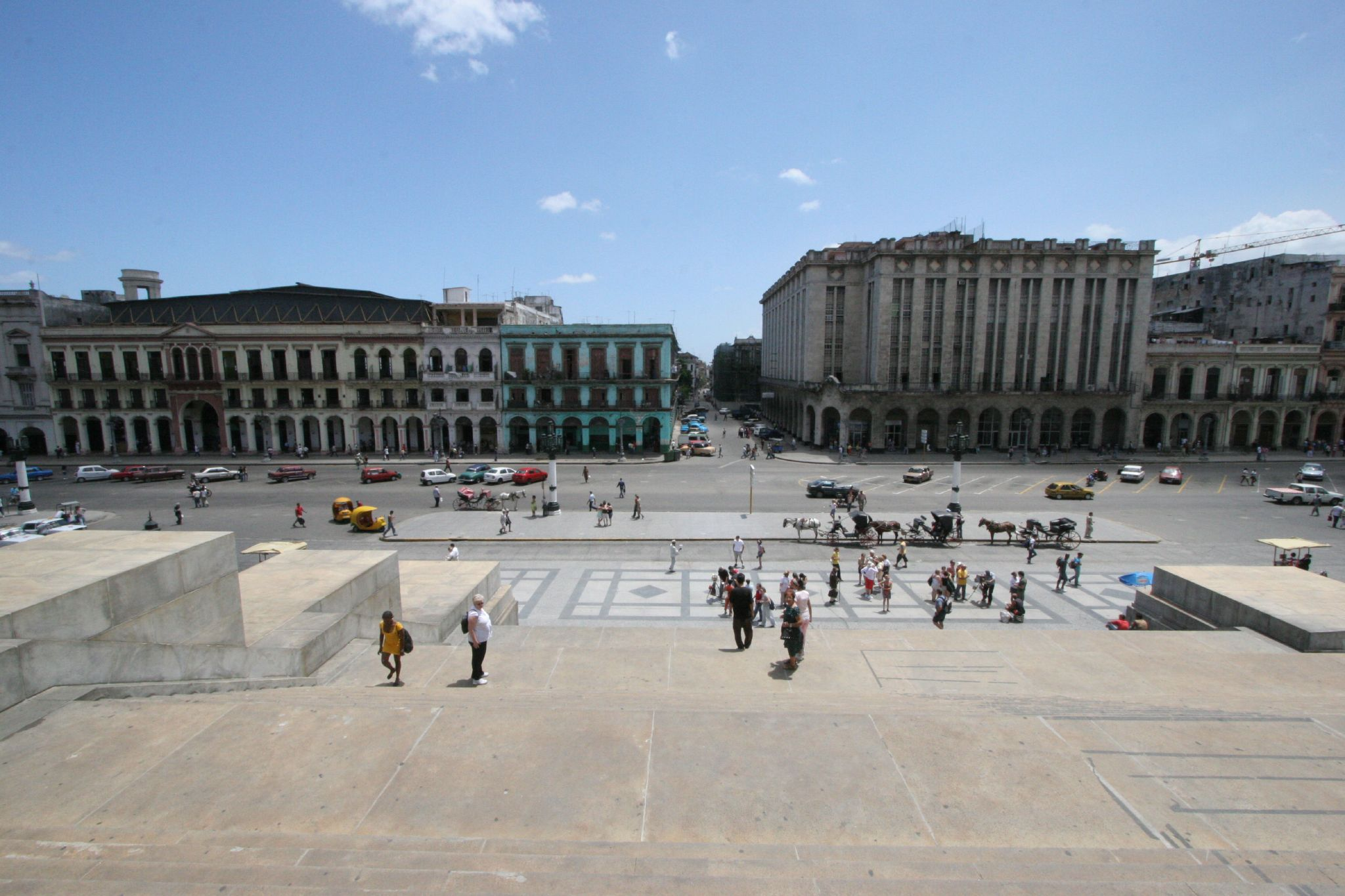
View from Capitolio steps

- The Malecón is the avenue that runs along the seawall at the northern shore of Havana, from Old Havana to the Almendares River.
- The Paseo del Prado, Havana is the street that forms the western edge of Old Havana, being its boundary with Centro Habana.
- Castillo del Morro, a picturesque fortress guarding the entrance to Havana bay. The construction of the castle Los Tres Reyes del Morro owed to the step along in Havana of the English pirate Sir Francis Drake. The king of Spain arranged its construction on a big stone which was known by the name of El Morro. He sent the field master Juan de Texeda, accompanied by the military engineer Battista Antonelli, who came to Havana in 1587 and began the task at once.
- La Cabaña fortress, located on the east side of the Havana Bay. It impresses with its 18th-century walls, constructed at the same time as El Morro. Every night at 9 p.m., soldiers dressed in uniforms of the era shoot from here, the "el cañonazo de las nueve", (gunshot of the nine). It goes off every day, to warn of the closing of the doors of the wall that surrounded the city.
- San Salvador de la Punta Fortress, On the shore opposite to the Castle of El Morro, at the beginning of the curve of El Malecon, rises the fortress of San Salvador de la Punta. It was constructed in 1590, and in 1629 the Chapter of Havana decided that to defend better the port, to join it, at night, with the El Morro by using a thick chain that prevented the entry of enemy ships.
- Castillo de la Real Fuerza, The fortress or (lit.) Castle of the Royal Army is another big monument that closes the Plaza de las Armas. It was the first big fortification of the city, initiated in 1558 on the ruins of an ancient fortress. In the same year, the Crown sent to Cuba the engineer Bartolomé Sanchez, supervised by 14 official and main stonemasons in order to reconstruct the castle, which had been set fire and destroyed by the French corsair Jacques de Sores.
- Catedral de San Cristóbal, the most prominent building on the Plaza de la Catedral. The cathedral was raised on the chapel after 1748 by order of the bishop from Salamanca, Jose Felipe de Trespalacios. It is one of the most beautiful and sober churches of the American baroque.
- National Capitol, styled after the Panthéon (Paris), looking similar to the U.S. Capitol.
- Galician Center, Central Park, The Galician Center, of neobaroque style was established as a social club of the Galician emigrants between 1907 and 1914. Built on the Theater Tacon (nowadays Great Theater of Havana), it was open during the Carnival of 1838 with five masked dances.
- Plaza de Armas – the main touristic square. The origin of its name is military, since from the end of the 16th century the ceremonies and the military events took place here.
- Gran Teatro de la Havana, the Great Theater of Havana is famous, particularly for the acclaimed National Ballet of Cuba and its founder Alicia Alonso. It sometimes performs the National Opera. The theater is also known as concert hall, Garcia Lorca, the biggest in Cuba.
- The Museum of the Revolution, located in the former Presidential Palace, with the boat Granma on display in front of the museum.
- San Francisco de la Habana Basilica, Habana Vieja, The set of church and convent of San Francisco de Asis, built in the year 1608 and reconstructed in 1737.

== Threats ==
In 2008, Hurricane Ike destroyed many structures in Old Havana, overturning years of conservation work directed at the iconic antiquated buildings of the area. Not only did it damage historic buildings, but it forced many of Old Havana's residents to flee for safety. The threats that hurricanes pose adds to an already tenuous state for Old Havana's many historic buildings. Age, decay, and neglect combine with natural factors in a complex set of threats to the long-term preservation of this historic old town.

== Photo gallery ==
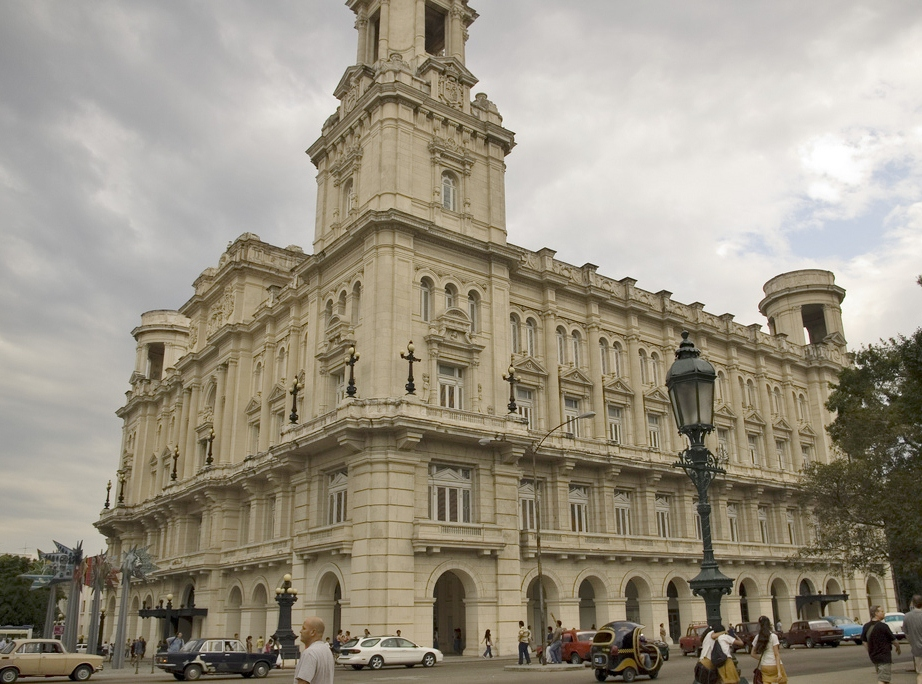
Museum of Fine Arts

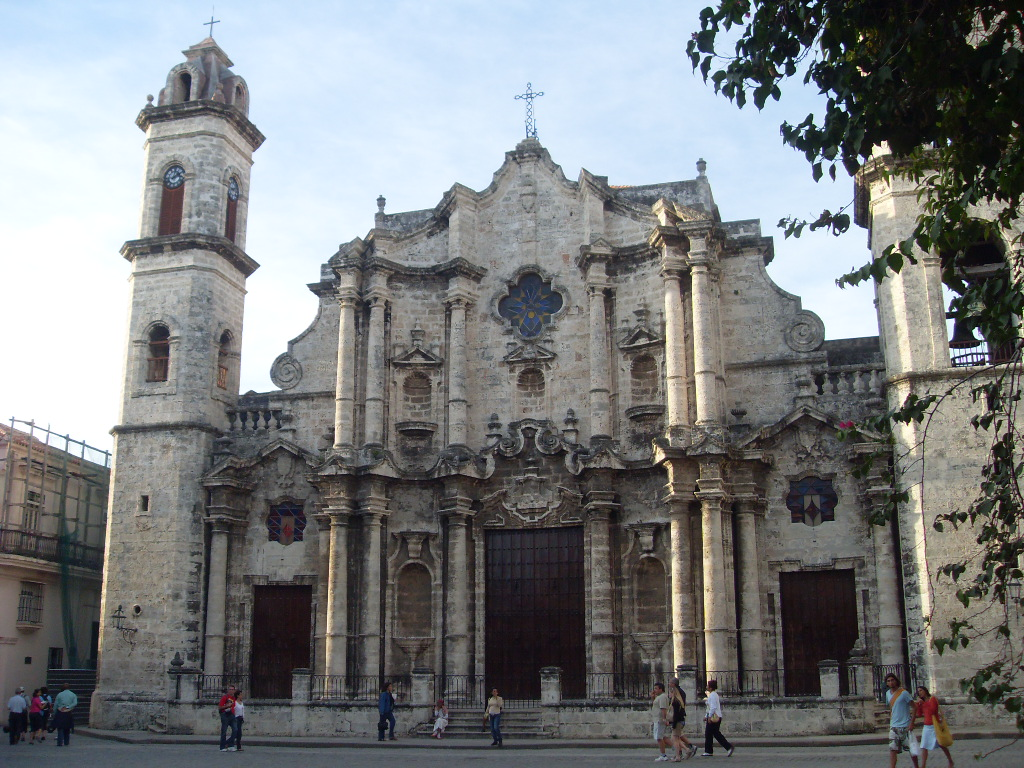
Cathedral of Havana

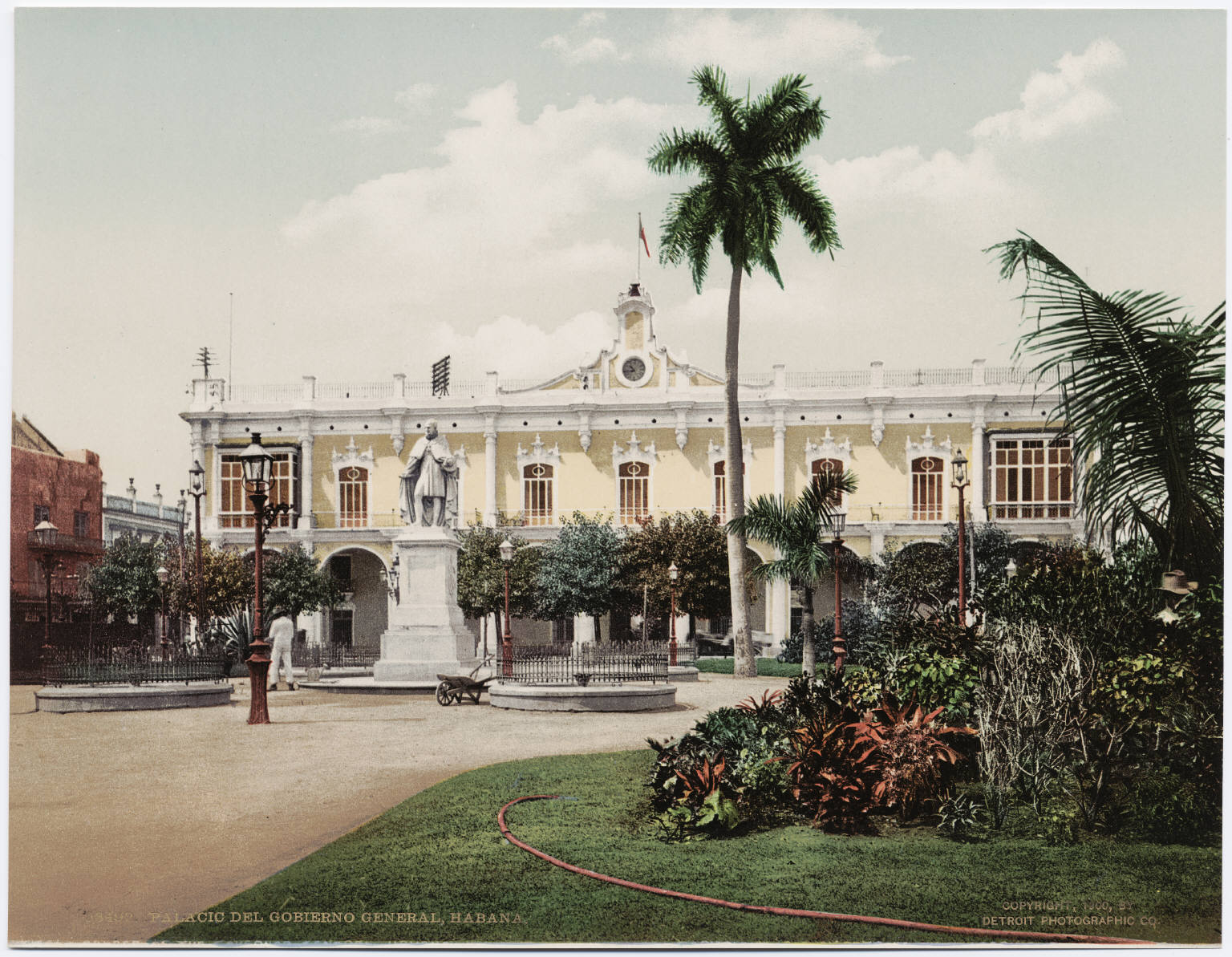
Palacio de los Capitanes Generales, Havana, Cuba

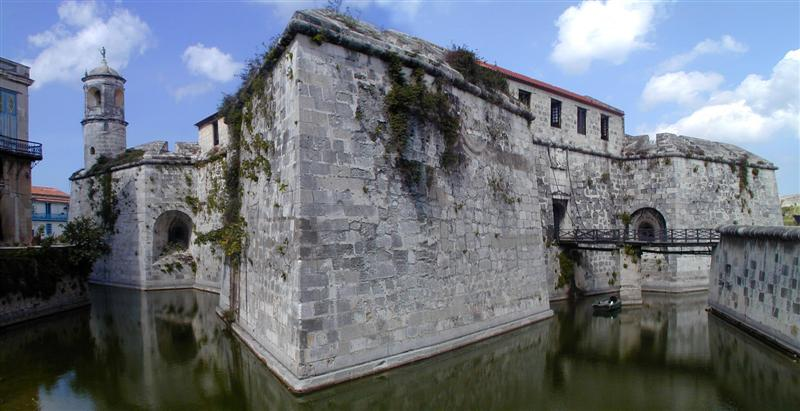
Castillo de la Real Fuerza

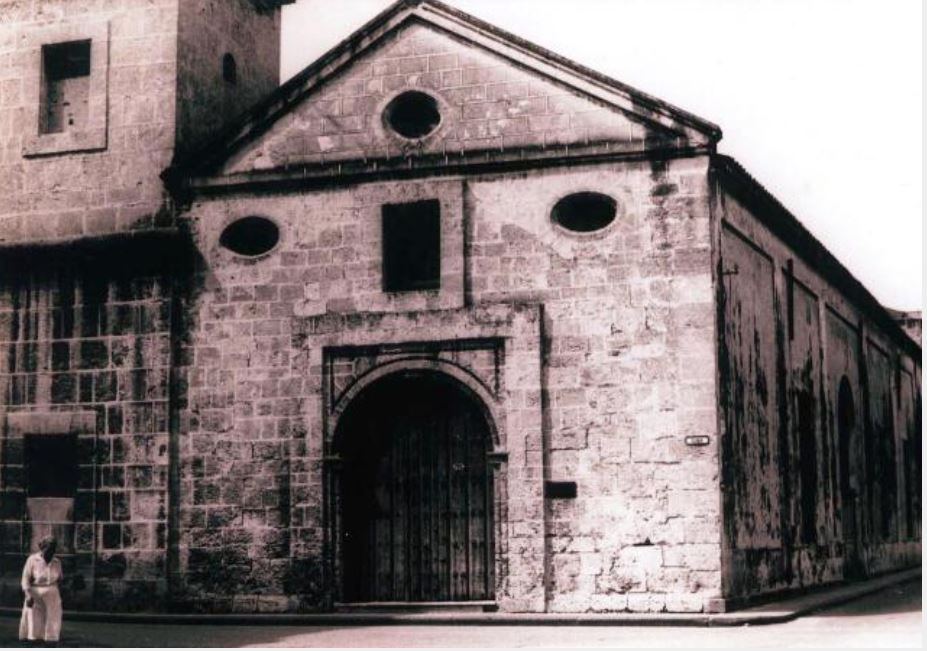
Iglesia del Espíritu Santo, Havana

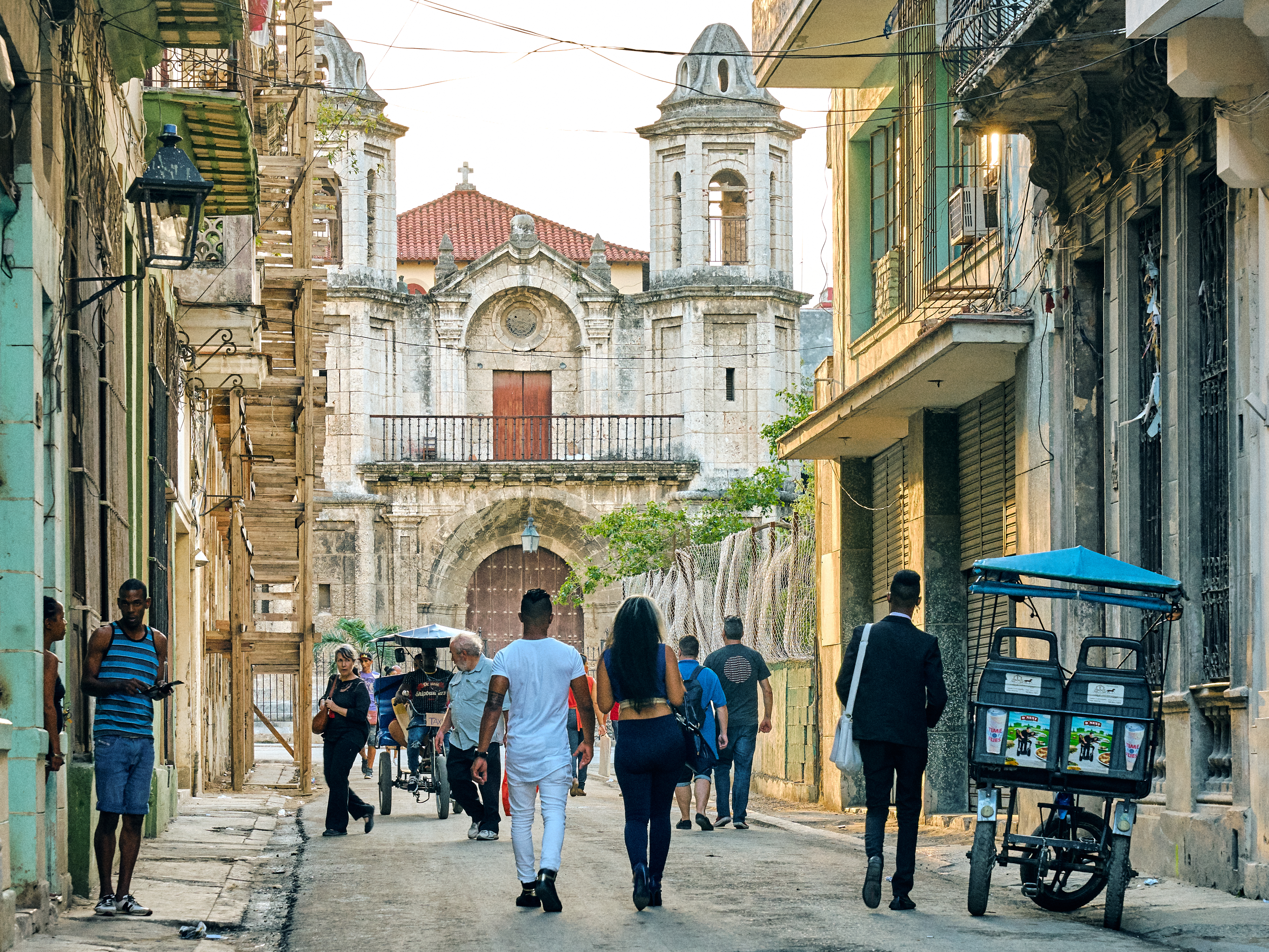
Church Santo Cristo del Buen Viaje

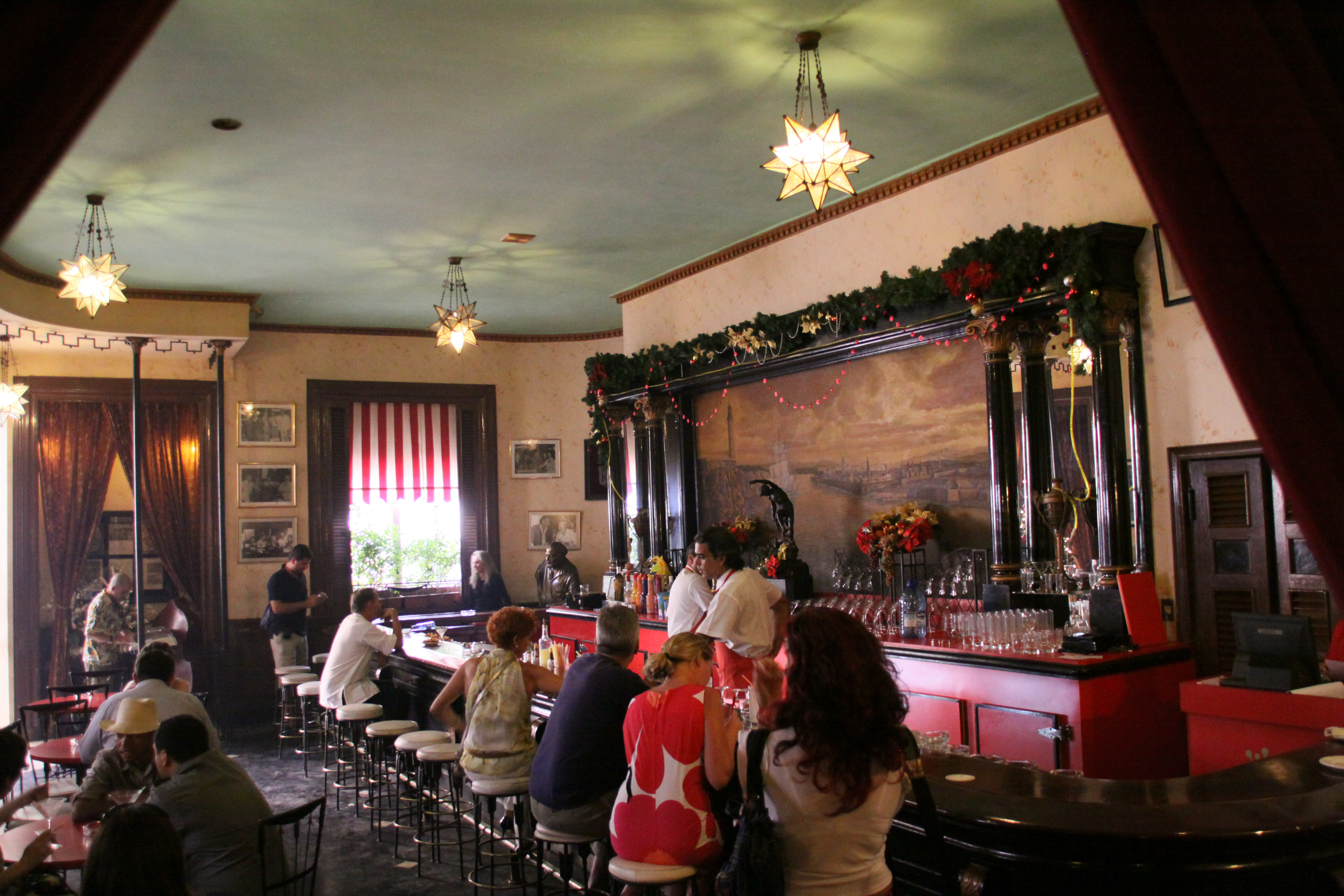
Floridita Bar

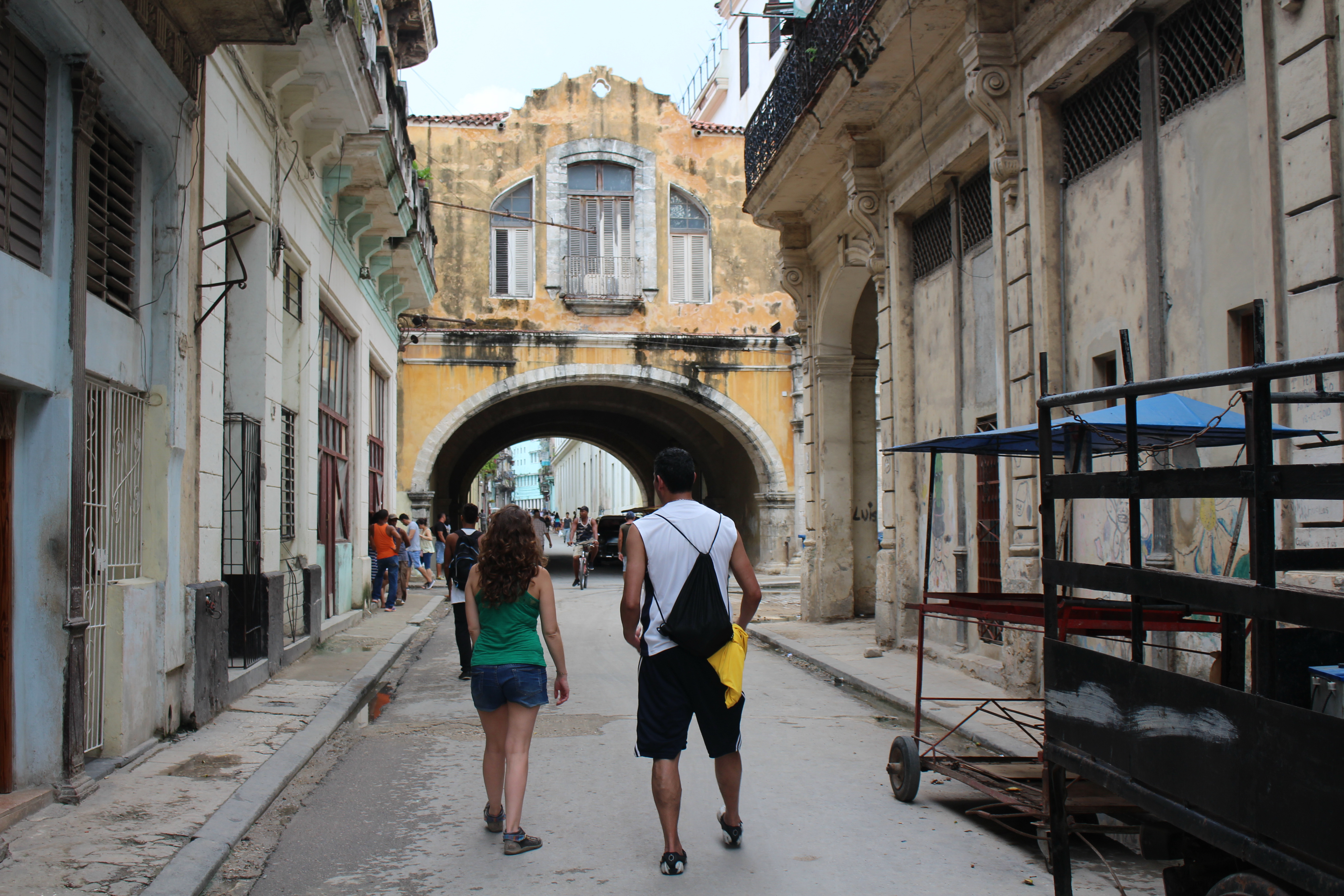
Arco de Belén, Havana

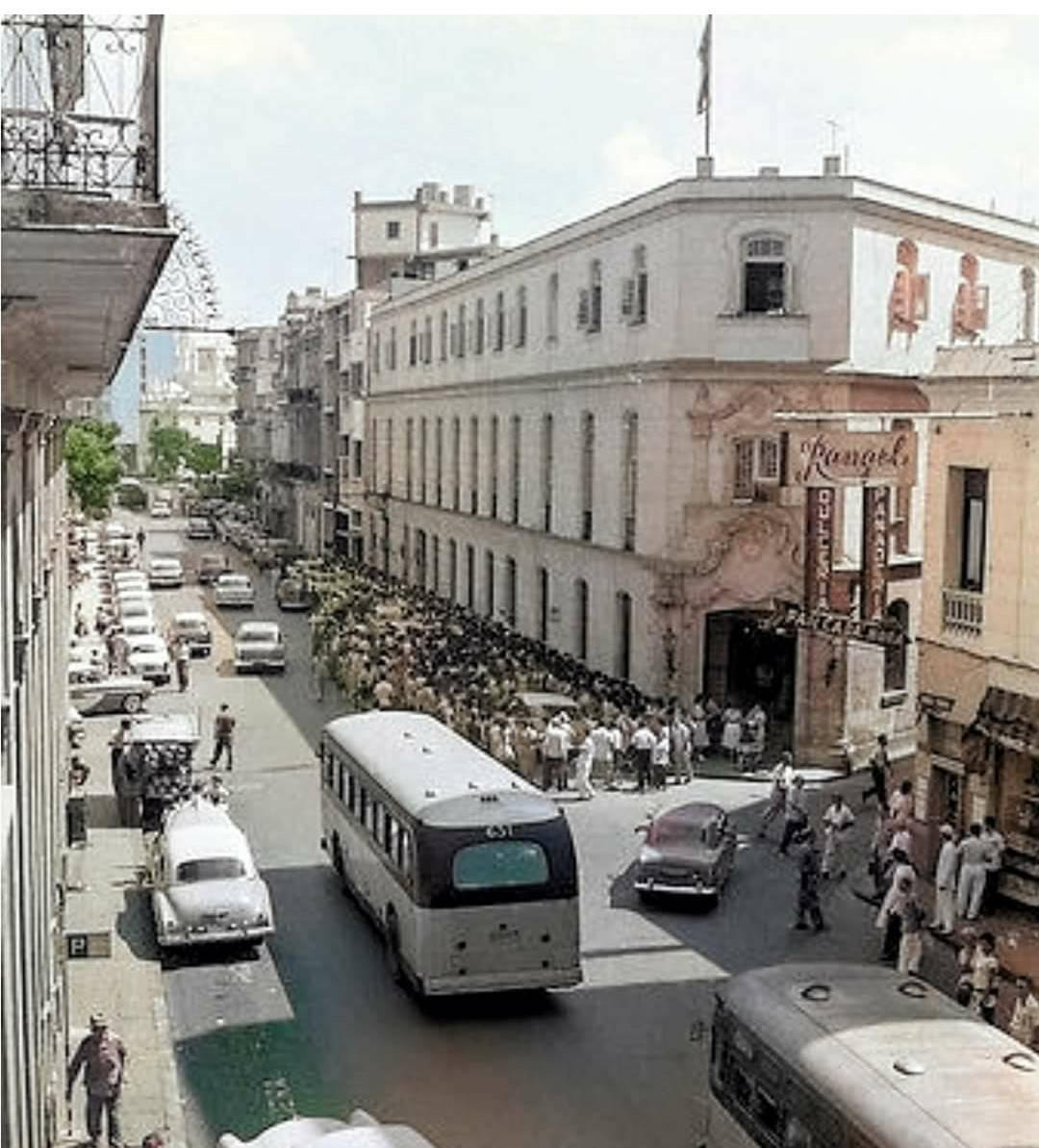
Cuartel de Milicias, Havana

== Twin towns – sister cities ==
Old Havana is twinned with the following cities:

- Viveiro, Spain
- Cartagena, Colombia
- Guanajuato, Guanajuato, Mexico
- Sintra, Portugal

== See also ==
- Havana
- List of World Heritage Sites in the Caribbean
