= Church del Espíritu Santo, Havana =

Iglesia del Espíritu Santo
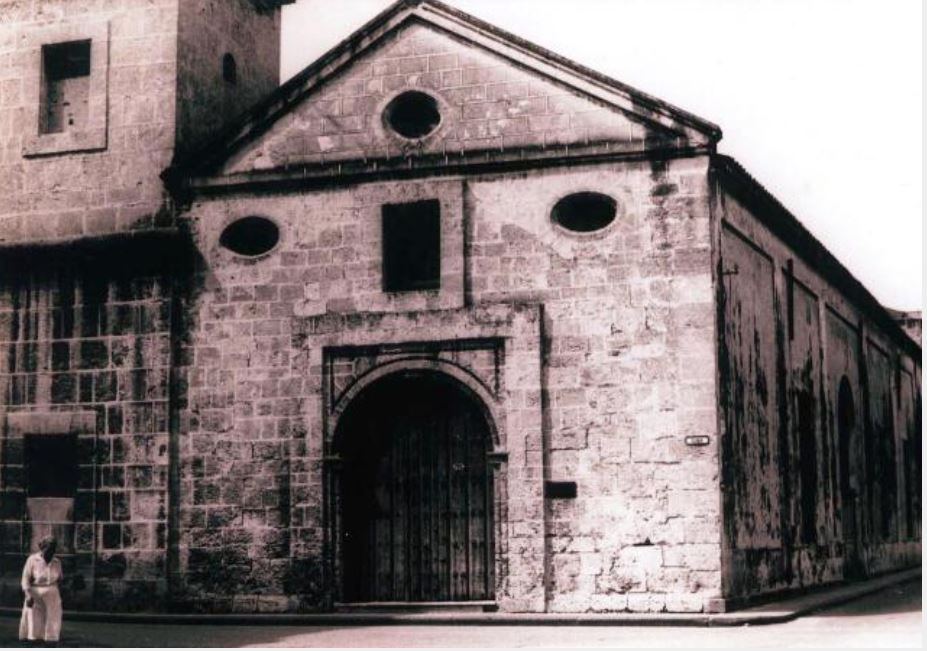
- Interactive map of the Iglesia del Espíritu Santo area

General information
- Type: Religious
- Location: No.702 Calle Cuba, Havana, Cuba
- Coordinates: 23.1325°N 82.3504°W
- Completed: 1648

The Iglesia del Espíritu Santo is a colonial church in Old Havana, Havana, Cuba that was built in 1635 on the corner of Calles Cuba and Acosta. It contains notable paintings including a seated, post-crucifixion Christ on the right wall, and catacombs.

== History ==
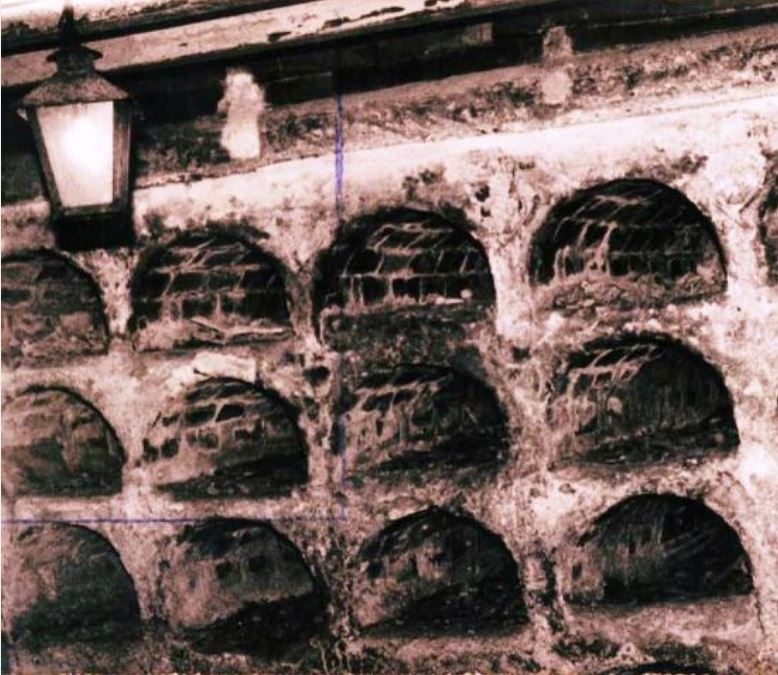
Iglesia del Espíritu Santo, Havana. Master sepulchre

The church was rebuilt and expanded in 1648 and given the rank of a parish. During the colonial era it had exceptional importance, since by a papal bull of 1772 and a Royal Certificate of 1773, of Charles III of Spain, it was declared "Única Iglesia inmune en esta ciudad, construida en 1772." ("the only immune church in this city, built-in 1772."); any persecuted individual could find Amparo (sanctuary) in it against the action of the authorities or of justice. A metal plaque at the foot of the bell tower attests to this fact.

== Paintings ==
There are original paintings by the Cuban painter José Nicolás de la Escalera ("Cuba's first painter") and Arístides Fernández (20th century), among them the large oil painting titled The Burial of Christ.

== Architecture ==
Plan of Iglesia del Espíritu Santo, Havana, Cuba

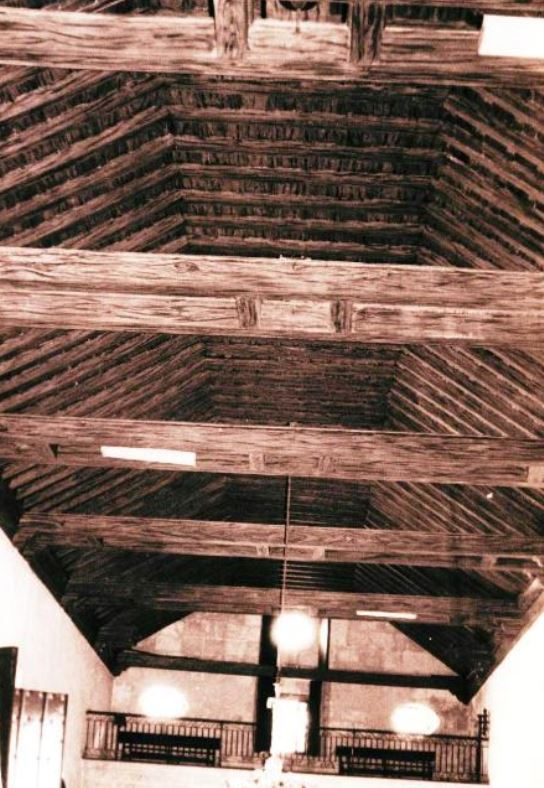
Iglesia del Espíritu Santo_roof construction looking towards the front.

The Iglesia del Espíritu Santo's greatest interest from an architectural point of view lies in the simplicity of the coral stone construction and the lack of lavish decoration. (Note: Many buildings in Havana are constructed out of coral stone including the Colegio Nacional de Arquitectos de Cuba, the promenade of El Prado, and the San Carlos and San Ambrosio Seminary. Some of the exterior walls along Calle N on the ground floor of the podium of the FOCSA Building are covered with 12"x12" coral tiles.) Other elements of great importance are the funerary crypts that were discovered in 1953. The crypt is from times before the Colon Cemetery (1876) in El Vedado was built. The crypt is entered from the left of the altar and contains several catacombs.

=== Cuban uni-nave ===
The building was built in the "uni-nave" style, as pointed out by Joaquín Weiss, a Cuban architect, and historian and one of the most authoritative authorities on the subject. Uni-nave was the style of Cuban religious constructions in the seventeenth century and meant that it originally had only one central nave. An additional side nave In the first years of the 18th century, the bell tower was built and around 1720 the vault of the presbytery was built. In 1760, Bishop D. Pedro Morell of Santa Cruz ordered the construction of a nave (8x29m) lateral to the main temple nave.

The church sits on a plinth of about 18 cm that may be seen along Calles Cuba and Acosta. The building is 60m long as measured on the exterior, east–west along Calle Acosta, although from the interior it appears that the last 10m was a later addition as the walls of this ten-meter square room are thinner (along Calle Acosta) and the roof structure does not span the ten-meter dimension. There is a column in the middle of the room to distribute the weight of the roof.

=== Bays ===
There are seven bays of approximately fifty-seven centimeters in length along the main nave. The first bay at the entrance is the shortest of about five meters in length and contains a balcony above which is reached by the stairs of the belfry. The elliptical arch supported by matching pilasters at opposite walls date from 1808 which is the year of the construction of the bell tower. In the middle of the 19th century, the entire wall that faces Acosta Street was rebuilt and the main façade was remodeled. The three-story bell-tower was built in the year 1808 and it is located immediately to the left of the church upon entering, it is one of the tallest structures in Old Havana. The tower was built by the master Pedro Hernández de Santiago.

There are five windows along the Calle Acosta wall and, except for the window in the presbytery which aligns with the center of the room, do not align with the grid of the columns. Thus the windows appear to be haphazardly placed without regard for the geometry of the nave or the rhythm of the structure.

=== Ceiling ===
The roof of the church terminates on the interior in a wooden ceiling of paired cross-tie braces and hidden tie backs springing from every column and supported on wooden corbels. The wood cross-tie brace ceiling is a common construction in Havana and may be seen in the wooden ceiling of the Church of Santo Cristo del Buen Viaje at Amargura and Cristo Streets in Havana Vieja and Iglesia de Santa Clara de Asis

== See also ==
- Havana Cathedral
- El Templete
- Church of San Francisco de Paula, Havana
