= Antonio Maceo monument, Havana =

Antonio Maceo monument
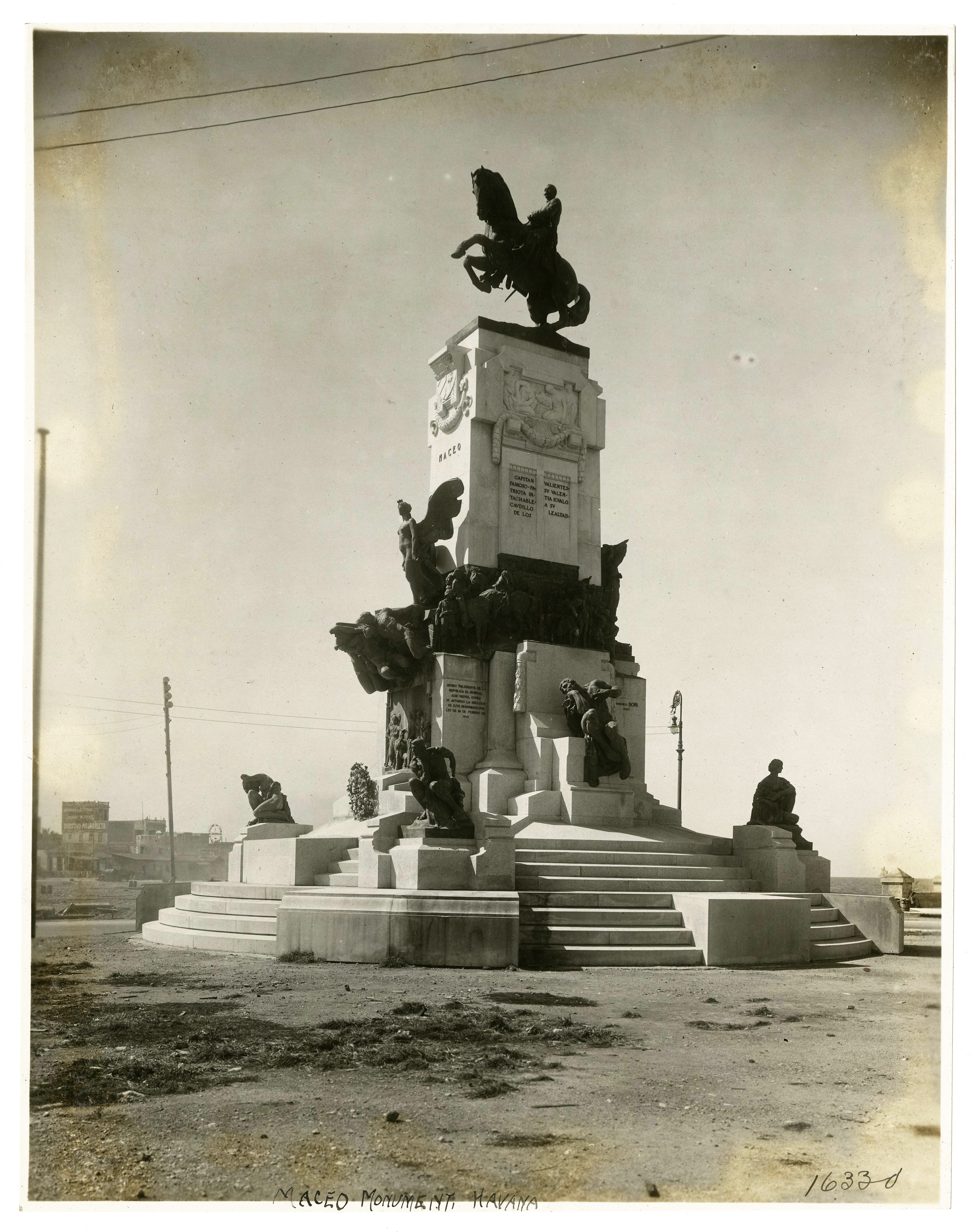
- Interactive map of the Antonio Maceo monument area

General information
- Type: Sculpture
- Architectural style: New classical
- Location: Havana, Cuba
- Coordinates: 23.141309°N 82.372093°W
- Estimated completion: 1916

The Antonio Maceo monument is a 1916 bronze statue by the Italian sculptor Doménico Boni located in the neighborhood of San Lázaro, between Malecón and the Hermanos Ameijeiras Hospital.

== History ==
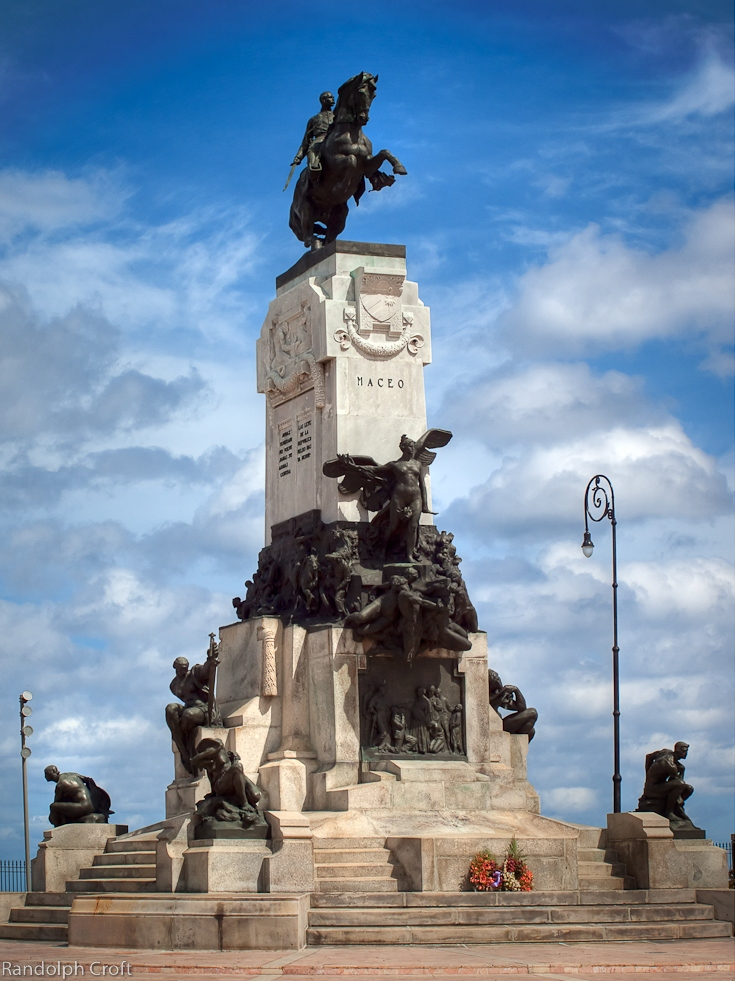
Antonio Maceo Monument

La Casa de Beneficencia, the hotel Manhattan on Calles Belascoáin and San Lazaro, by the U.S. Engineering firm of Purdy and Henderson, and the Hotel Vista Alegre also at the beginning of Calle Belascoáin, anchored a geographically important corner close to the sea of the large expanse of land known as El Barrio San Lazaro and within it and immediately to the north was the Caleta de San Lazaro. Cayo Hueso was also a part of El Barrio de San Lazaro. Cayo Hueso ("bone cay"), its name derives from its location near the Espada Cemetery. it was demolished in 1908. Among the oldest institutions in the area were the leprosy hospital (demolished in 1916), the Casa de Beneficencia orphanage (currently the Hermanos Ameijeiras hospital). Buildings in the Barrio San Lazaro that were important to the early development of the city were the Hospital de San Dionisio for the mentally insane, the Cementerio General known as the Campo Santo and more commonly referred to as the Espada Cemetery was the precursor to the Colon Cemetery, and a room for the treatment of the mentally ill located on the side of the Real Casa de Beneficencia on Calle Belascoáin. The monument to Antonio Maceo was located near a place previously occupied by the Batería de la Reina, (1861), located in front of the La Casa de Beneficencia y Maternidad, at the intersection of Belascoaín and San Lázaro. In 1916 the monument was placed but the park was not built, many voices were raised in a protest demanding that a greater tribute be paid to the figure of Antonio Maceo.

== Gallery ==
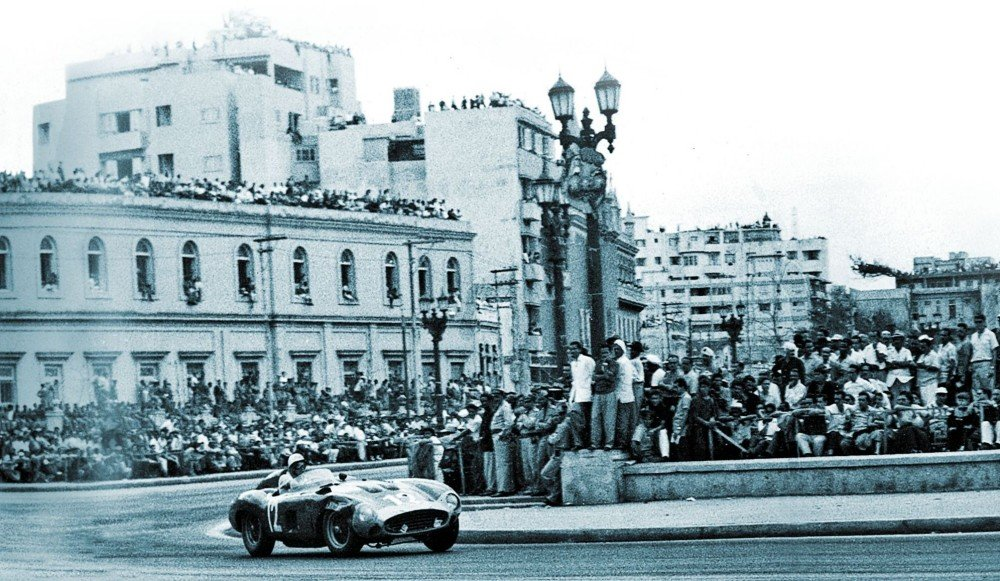
Cuban Grand Prix showing La Casa de Beneficencia and the Antonio Maceo park, 1957

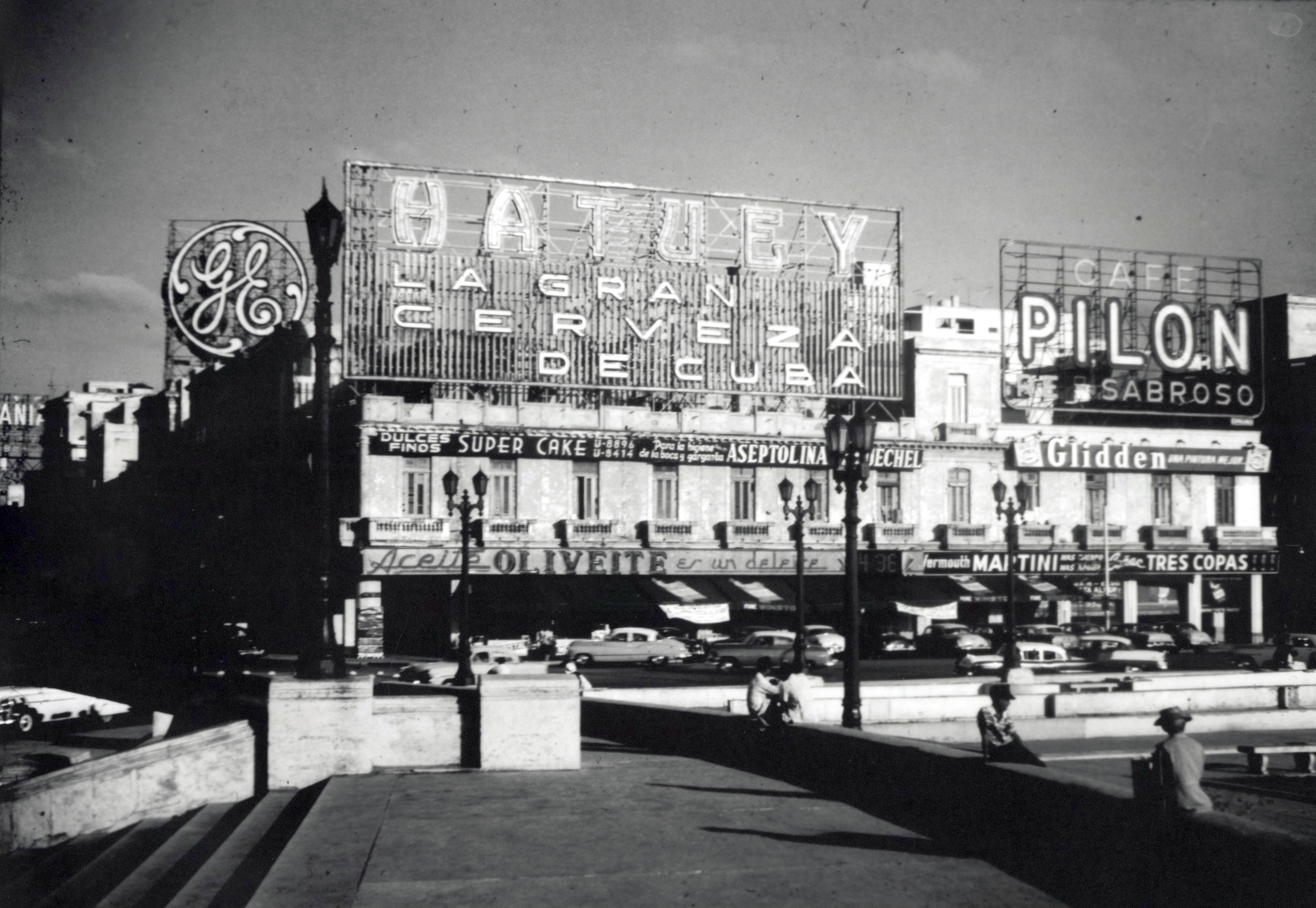
Neon signs at Calle Belascoain seen from Antonio Maceo Park

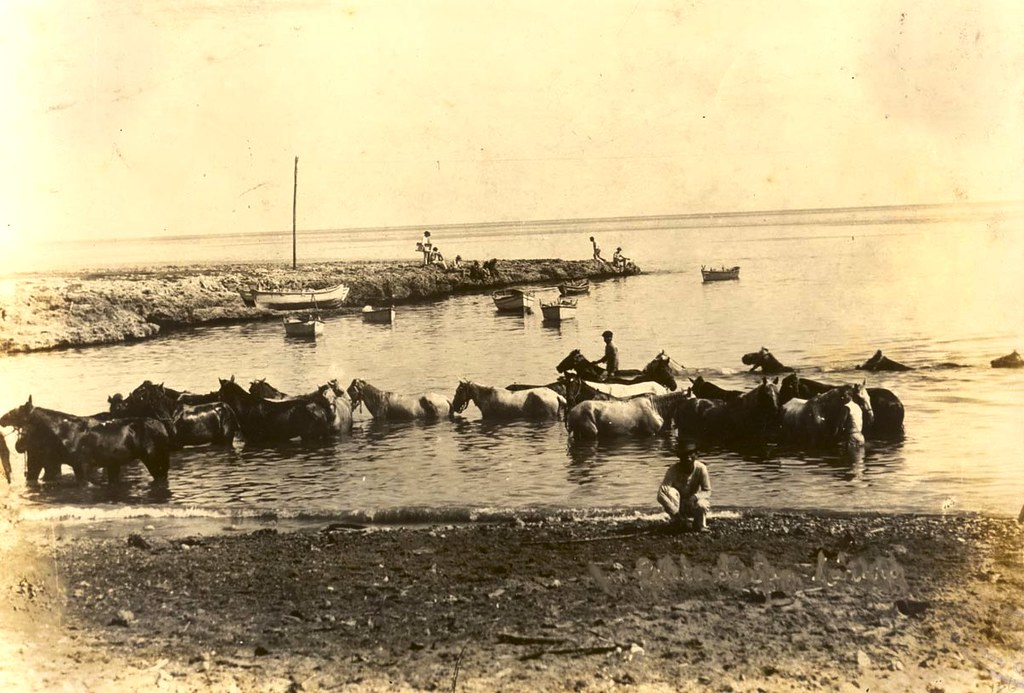
Caleta de San Lazaro, Havana, Cuba, the future site of the Antonio Maceo Park

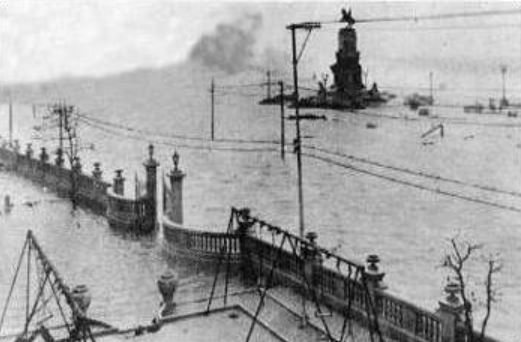
La Casa de Beneficencia y Maternidad during the hurricane of 1919 and the Antonio Maceo monument.

== See also ==
- Barrio de San Lázaro, Havana
- Caleta de San Lazaro
- Espada Cemetery
- La Casa de Beneficencia y Maternidad de La Habana
- Hospital de San Lázaro, Havana
- Malecón, Havana
- Havana Plan Piloto
- Batería de la Reina
