= Torreón de San Lázaro =

El Torreón de San Lázaro
- Interactive map of the El Torreón de San Lázaro area

General information
- Type: Defense
- Location: Havana, Cuba
- Coordinates: 23.141605482397°N 82.37408954425452°W
- Opened: 1781

Height
- Height: 9.14 m (30.0 ft)

Dimensions
- Diameter: 4.57 m (15.0 ft)

Technical details
- Structural system: Load bearing
- Material: Masonry
- Floor count: 1

El Torreón de San Lázaro is a round tower of masonry built on the shore of the Caleta de San Lazaro. The Torreón de San Lázaro is approximately 4.57 metres (15.0 ft) in diameter and 9.14 metres (30.0 ft) high with embrasures along its wall at the intermediate level and a battlement parapet at the third level roof. It has a wooden entry door at ground level. With the passage of time, the San Lazaro cove was filled and the tower was included in a Republican-era park named after Major General Antonio Maceo. In an 1853 map of Havana it is shown as the Torreón de Vijias (lookouts). In 1982, the Torreón was inscribed along with other historic sites in Old Havana on the UNESCO World Heritage List, because of the city's importance in the European conquest of the New World and its unique architecture.

== History ==
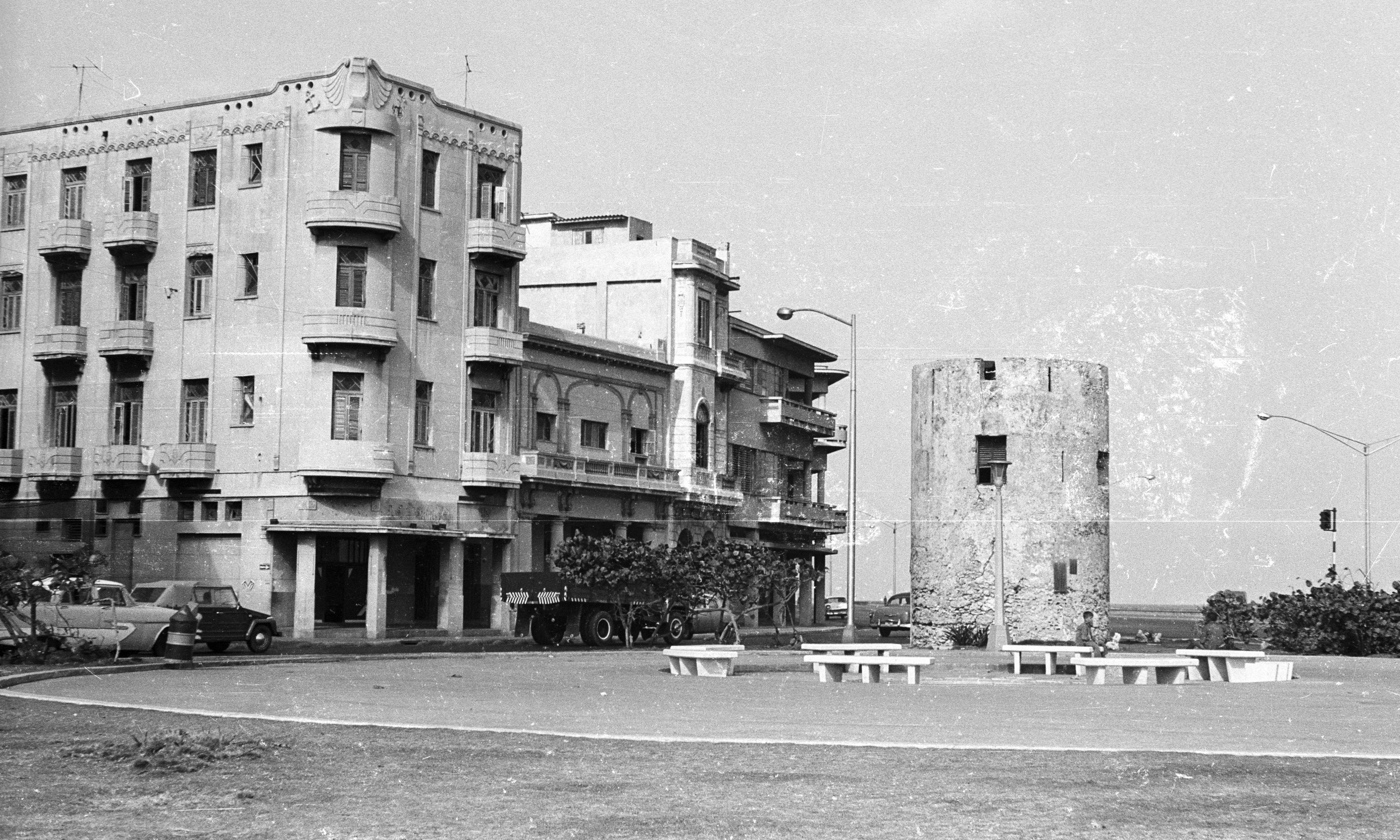
Marcos Lucio's Torreón de San Lázaro, built in 1665.

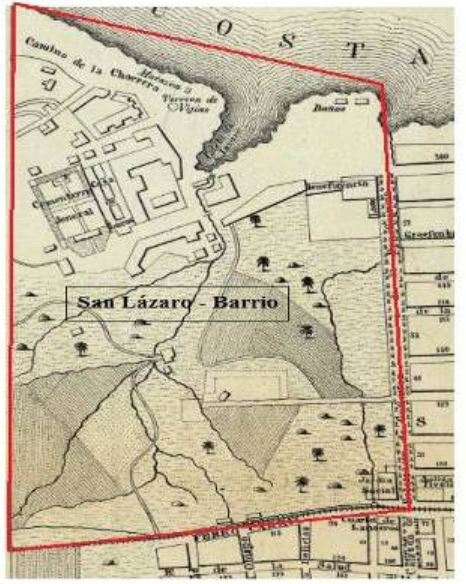
La Casa de Beneficencia y Maternidad. Map of barrio San Lazaro, 1855

From this fortification a lookout could warn military forces by way of torches of threats of attack by corsairs and pirates. In this regard, it served as a link in the defense chain between the Batería de la Reina, La Punta, and the Santa Clara Battery located at the site of today's Hotel Nacional.

== Gallery ==
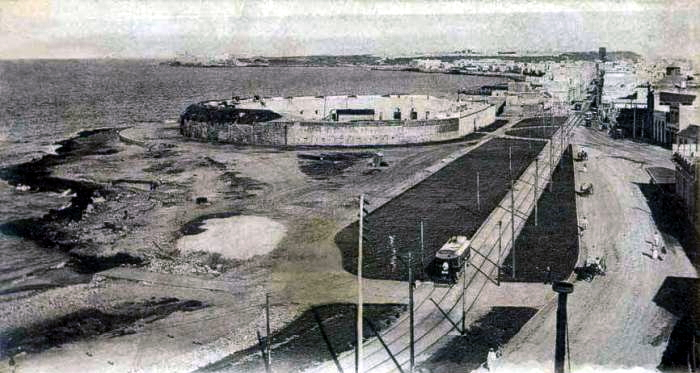
Batería de la de la Reina

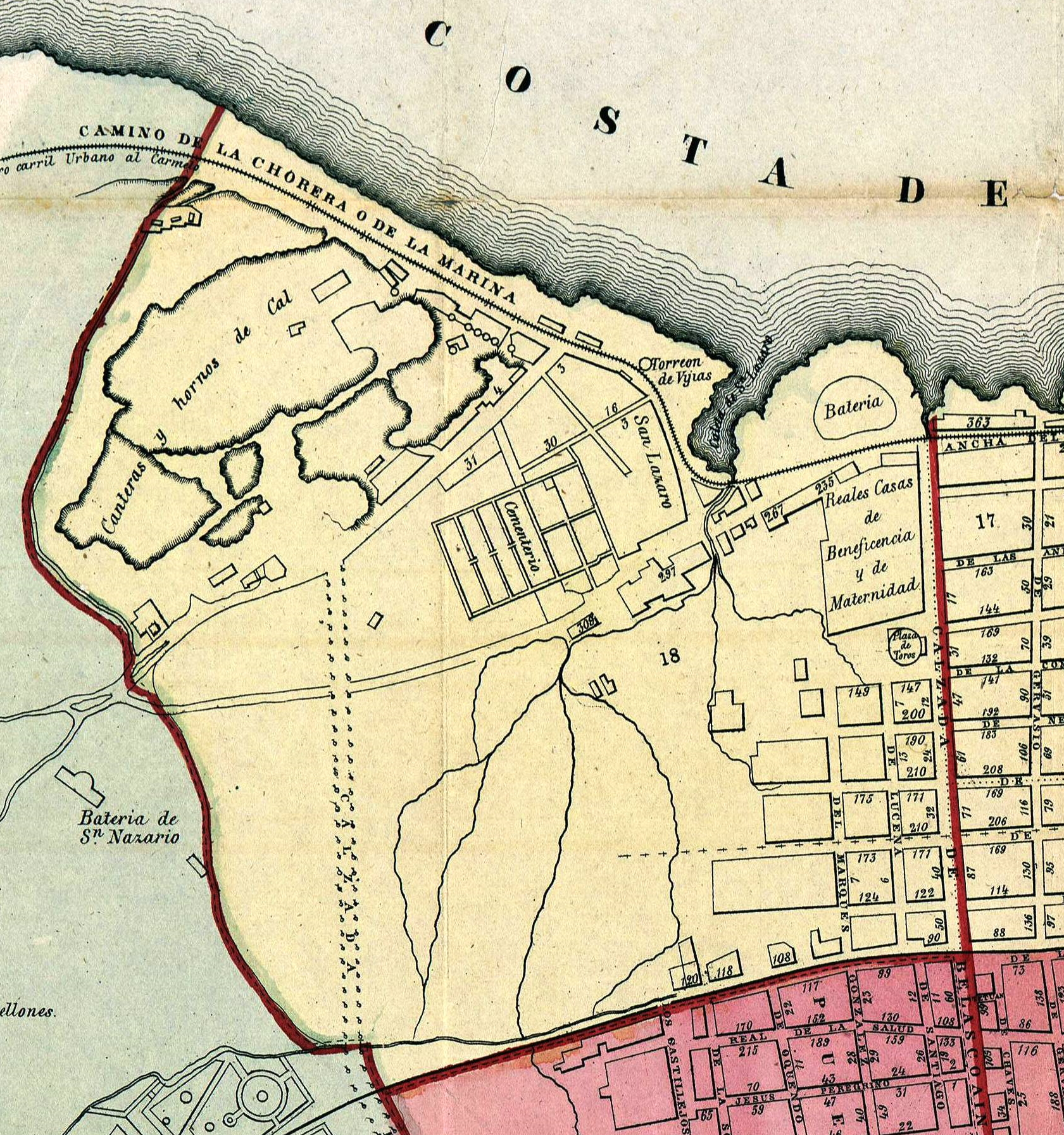
Map of Habana 1866

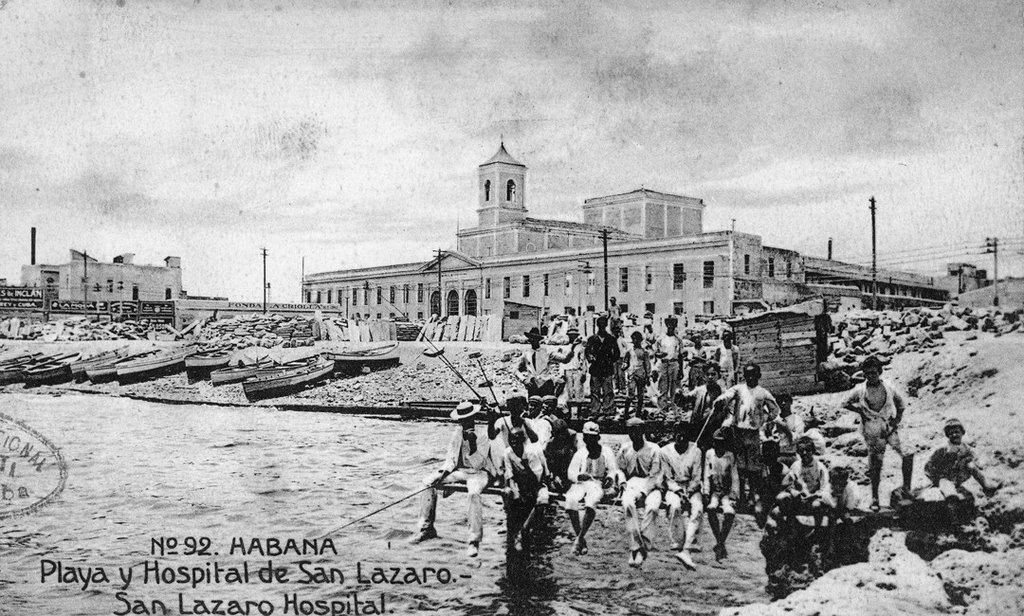
Hospital de San Lázaro, founded in 1781, showing Caleta de San Lazaro

== See also ==
- Barrio de San Lázaro, Havana
- Caleta de San Lazaro
- Espada Cemetery
- La Casa de Beneficencia y Maternidad de La Habana
- Hospital de San Lázaro, Havana
- Malecón, Havana
- La Cabaña
- Batería de la de la Reina
- Santa Clara Battery
