= Torreón de la Chorrera =

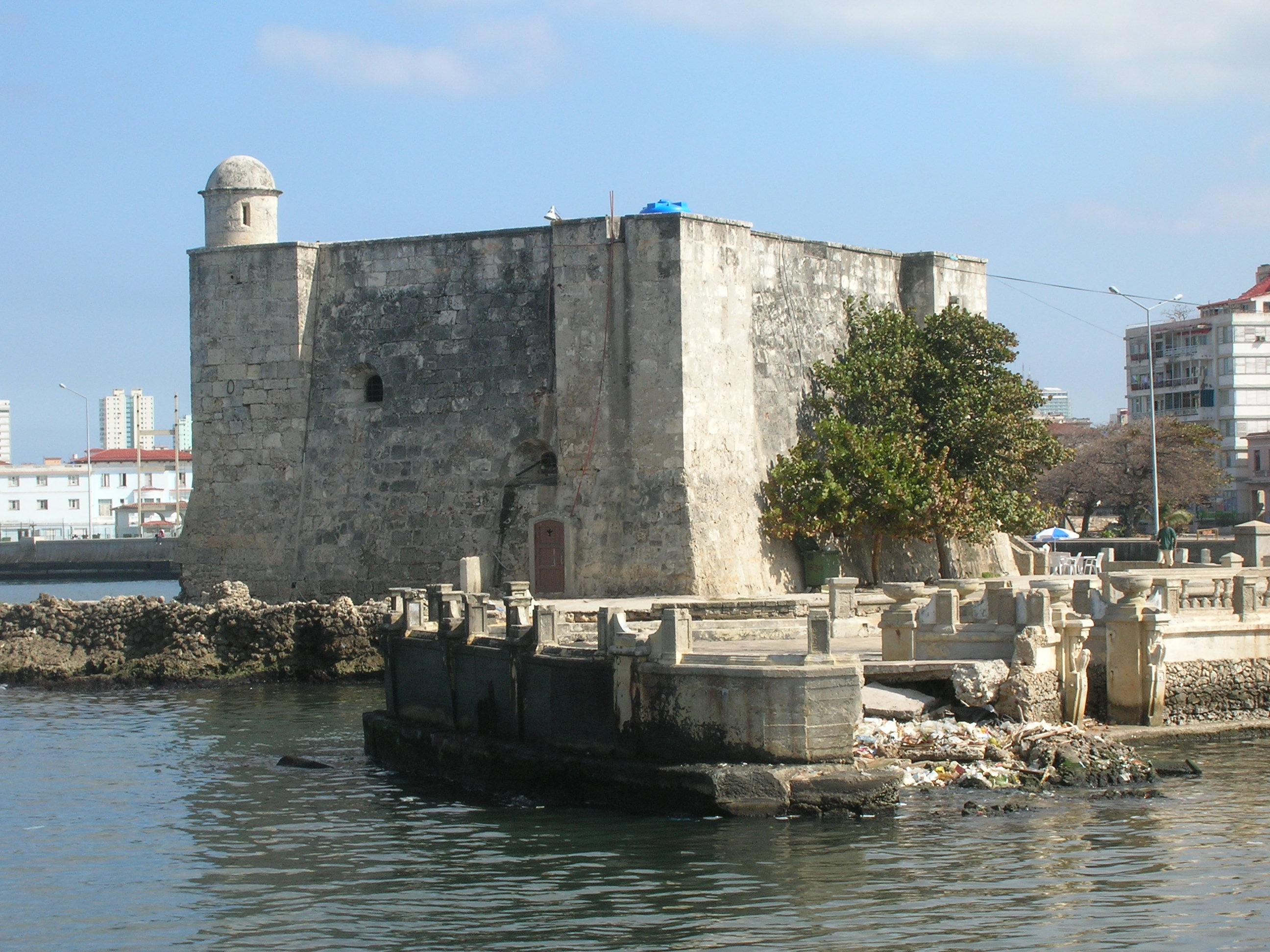
- Torreón de la Chorrera
- Interactive map of the Torreón de la Chorrera area

General information
- Type: Defensive structure
- Location: Cuba
- Coordinates: 23.13211840968728°N 82.40955681698966°W

Technical details
- Structural system: Load bearing
- Material: Masonry
- Floor count: 2
- Floor area: 231.60 m^{2} (2,492.9 sq ft)

The Torreón de la Chorrera (Tower of la Chorrera), or to give it its full name, Fuerte de Santa Dorotea de la Luna de la Chorrera, was completed in May 1646. The tower stands on a coral islet only a few metres from the shore and not much larger than the tower itself. The tower's purpose was to impede the entry of enemy ships into the mouth of the Almendares River. The British damaged and captured the tower when they took the city in 1762, after which the tower was rebuilt in its present form. Today, the tower contains a restaurant. In 1982, the Torreón was inscribed on the UNESCO World Heritage List, along with other historic sites in Old Havana, because of the city's importance in the European conquest of the New World, its fortifications, and its unique architecture.

== History ==
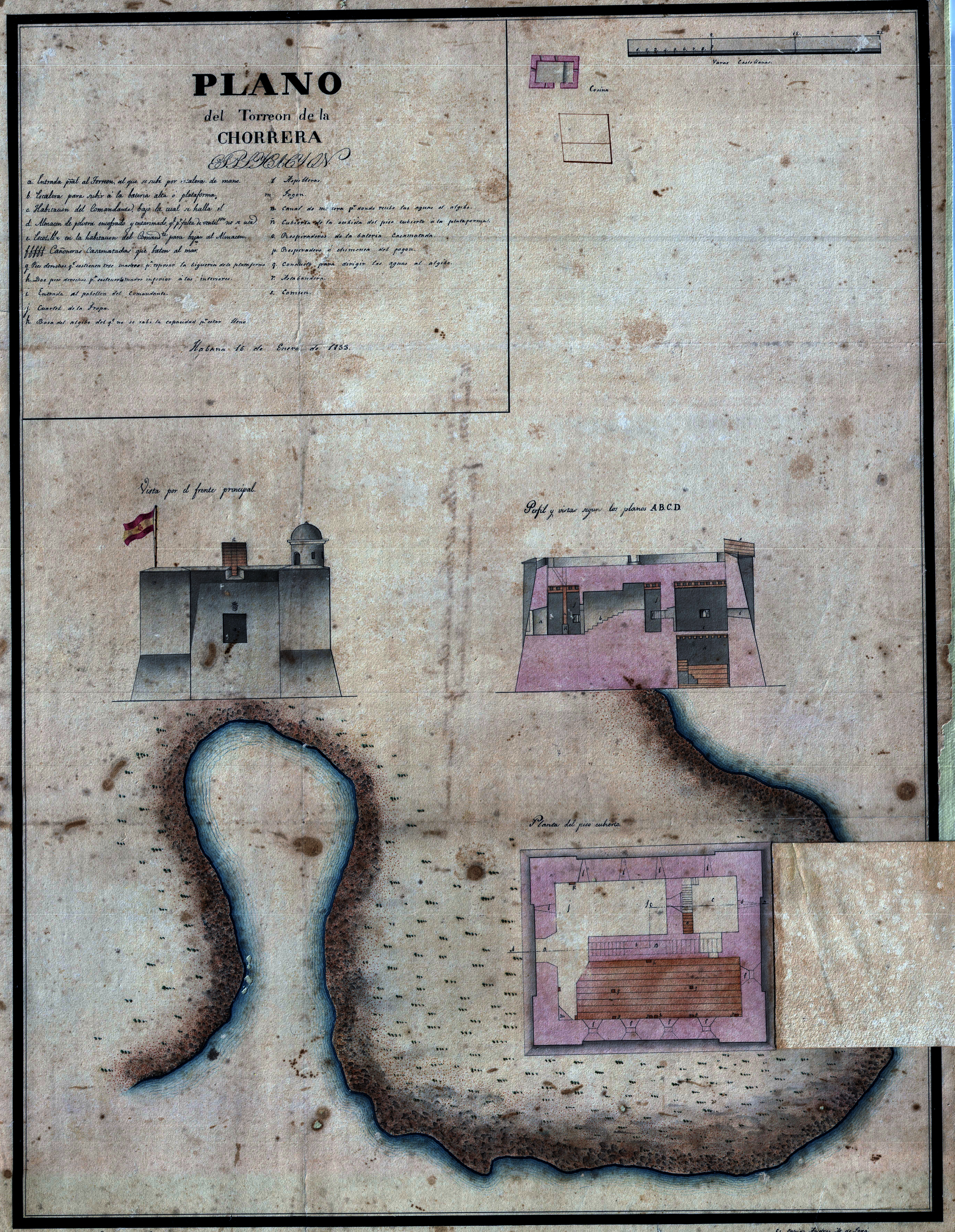
Plan of 1833 of Torreón de la Chorrera by Captain Don Evaristo Carrillo, Havana, Cuba

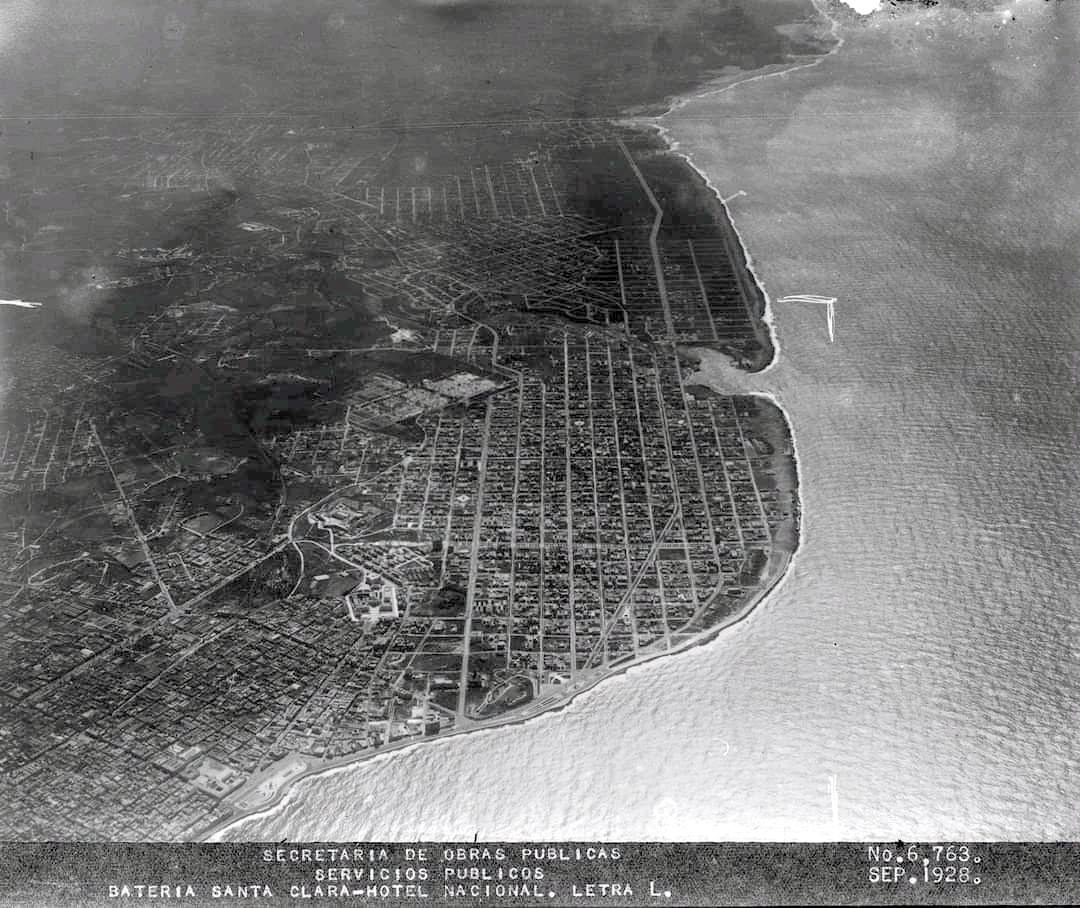
La Chorrera, north coast of Havana

Governor Pedro Vadés (1602–08) proposed building fortifications at the mouths of the La Chorrera (Almendares) and Cojimar rivers to the west and east of Havana as protection against attacks by the English. However, the end of the threat resulted in the abandonment of the project. Then in 1633 Captain-general Marquis de Cadereyta and Admiral Carlos de Ibarra came to Havana to inspect the state of the fortresses of La Fuerza, La Punta and El Morro. Both inspectors recommended that forts be built at the mouths of the two rivers because the locations were ideal for the landing of enemy troops and were out of range of the guns of the major fortresses. Two years later Governor Francisco Riaño Gamboa received the orders to build the towers.

However, nothing happened until 1646 when Governor Álvaro de Luna y Sarmiento (1639–47) completed the project to build the two towers due to concerns about the possibility of Dutch or Portuguese attacks. Juan Bautista Antonelli, the eldest son of the builder of Morro Castle and San Salvador de la Punta Fortress, built the towers. Earlier, in 1637, he had built the Castillo San Pedro de la Roca at Santiago de Cuba.

The original Chorrera Tower was round, like the towers on the coast of Spain that the Spanish built to repel the attacks of the Moors. It was armed with eleven guns and had a garrison of 50 men.

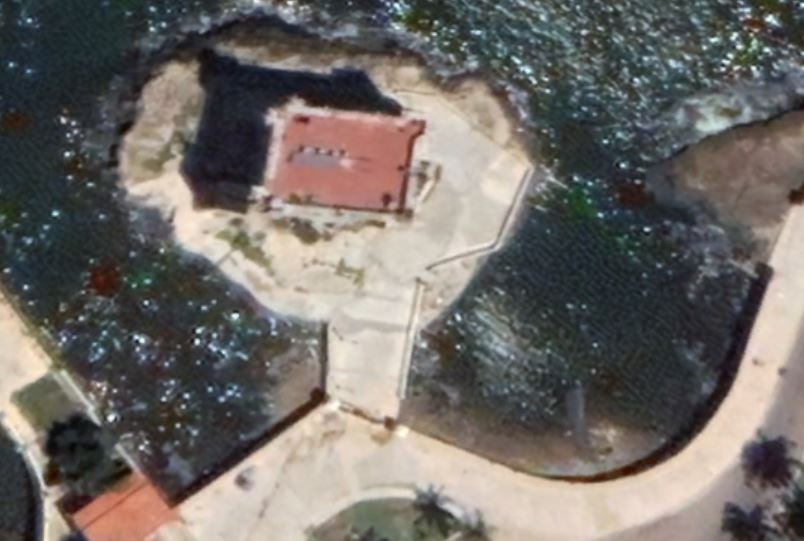
Torreón de la Chorrera, Havana, Cuba

In early 1762 Charles III of Spain declared war on England. Consequently, on 6 June General George Keppel, Lord Albemarle, with Vice-Admiral Sir George Pocock as naval commander, arrived off Havana with a large naval force and several thousand troops. The major British thrust came to the east of Havana, near Cojimar, which was defended by the Torreón de Cojimar, which Antonelli had also designed. On 10 June the British began cannonading the fort, which held out under its commanders, Captain Luis de Aguia and Rafael de Cardenas, until it ran out of ammunition. Three days later, a British force of some 2000 men landed and captured the tower. From there they moved on to take the hill of Vedado, and the heights of Aróstegui, where later the Spanish would construct Fortalezza El Principe. In the Battle of Havana (1762) the British captured Morro Castle, after which Havana surrendered. The British occupation of Havana lasted less than a year. The 1763 Treaty of Paris returned Havana and Manila to Spain In return Spain ceded Florida and Menorca to Great Britain and paid the Manila Ransom. Spain also received the large territory of French Louisiana as a payment for intervening in the war on the side of the French and as compensation for having lost Florida.

The Spanish rebuilt the tower as a two-storey rectangular building, some 80 by 60 feet. Its armament consisted of four larger and two smaller cannon, manned by a garrison of some 30 soldiers. A stone staircase gave access to the entrance to the tower on the second floor. A tablet over the door gives the name of the builders and the date of construction.

In 1898 the fort may again have seen action, this time during the Spanish–American War. The Spanish established a battery at La Chorrera, near the tower, using three 160mm guns salvaged from the aged unarmored cruiser Alfonso XII. This battery fired on US warships scouting the area.

== See also ==
- List of buildings in Havana
- Batería de la de la Reina
- Castillo San Salvador de la Punta
- Santa Clara Battery
- Castillo del Príncipe (Havana)
- Torreón de San Lázaro
- La Cabaña
- Morro Castle (Havana)
- Timeline of Havana
