= Batería de la Reina =

Colonial defense fortress in Havana

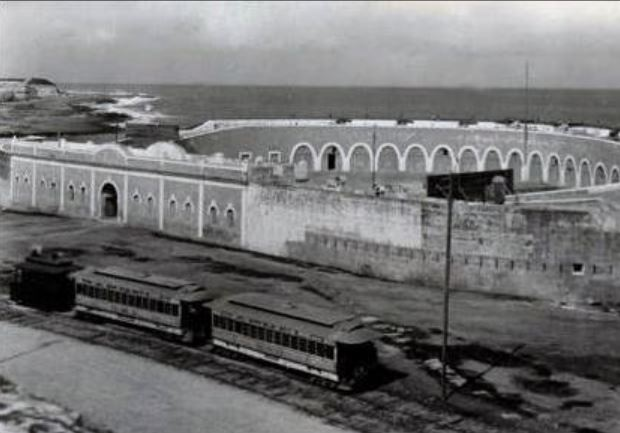
- Batería de la Reina
- Interactive map of the Batería de la Reina area

General information
- Status: Demolished
- Type: Defensive structure
- Architectural style: Fortress
- Location: Next to Caleta de San Lazaro, Havana, Cuba
- Coordinates: 23.141832°N 82.371513°W
- Groundbreaking: ca. 1856
- Estimated completion: 1661
- Destroyed: ca. 1900

Dimensions
- Diameter: 100 metres (330 ft)

Technical details
- Structural system: Load bearing
- Material: Brick
- Floor count: 1

Design and construction
- Known for: 44 pieces of artillery

Batería de la de la Reina, built between 1856 and 1861, was a Havana, Cuba colonial military defense fortress that had accommodations for a garrison of 250 men and 44 pieces of artillery. It was demolished in 1901. Its site was in the esplanade that today occupies the Antonio Maceo park. The fort was a semi-circular building with a 44-gun battery facing the sea. Its fires intersected with those of the Santa Clara Battery and the “Castillo de la Punta”.

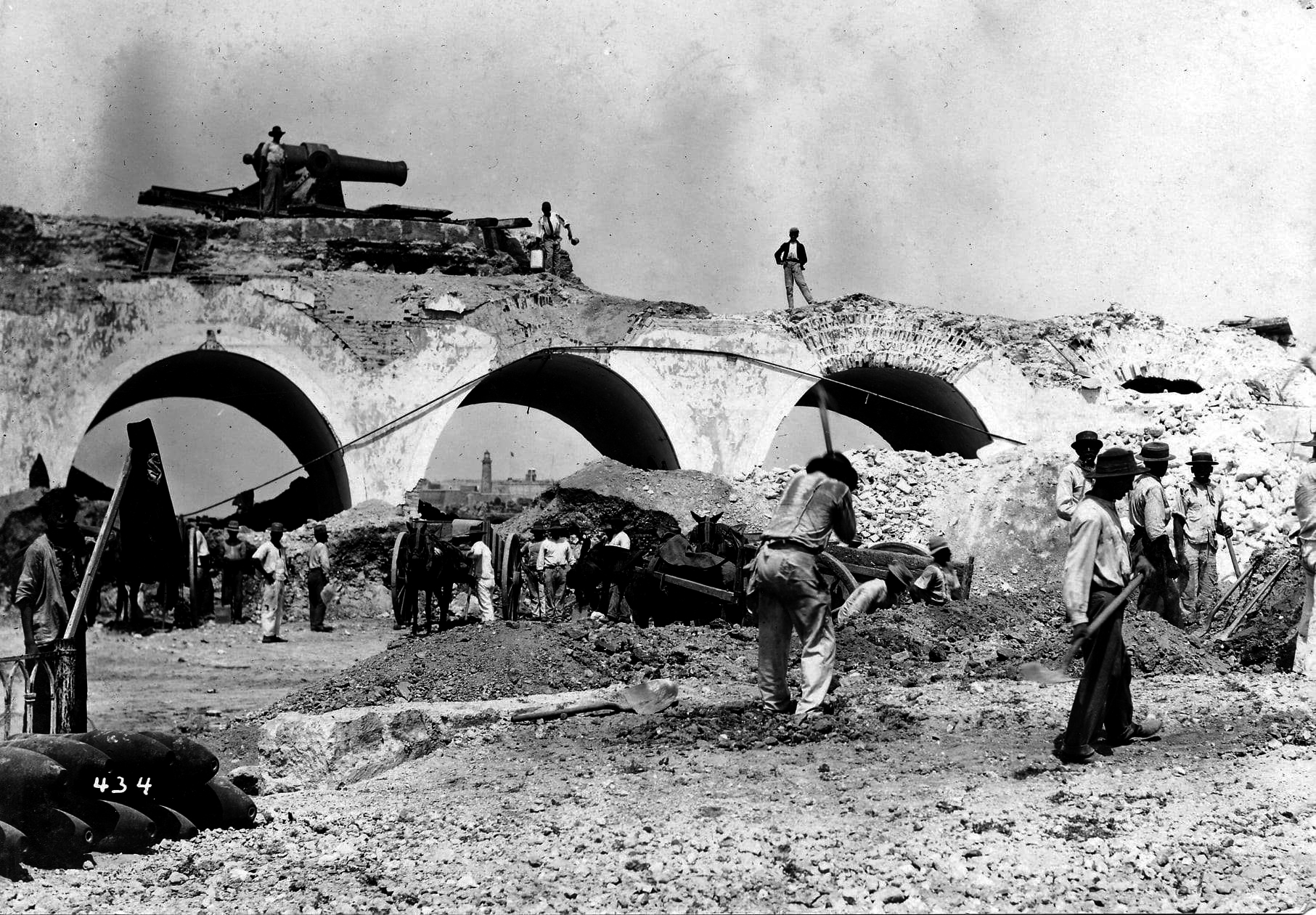
Batería de La Reina.1 demolition, 1900

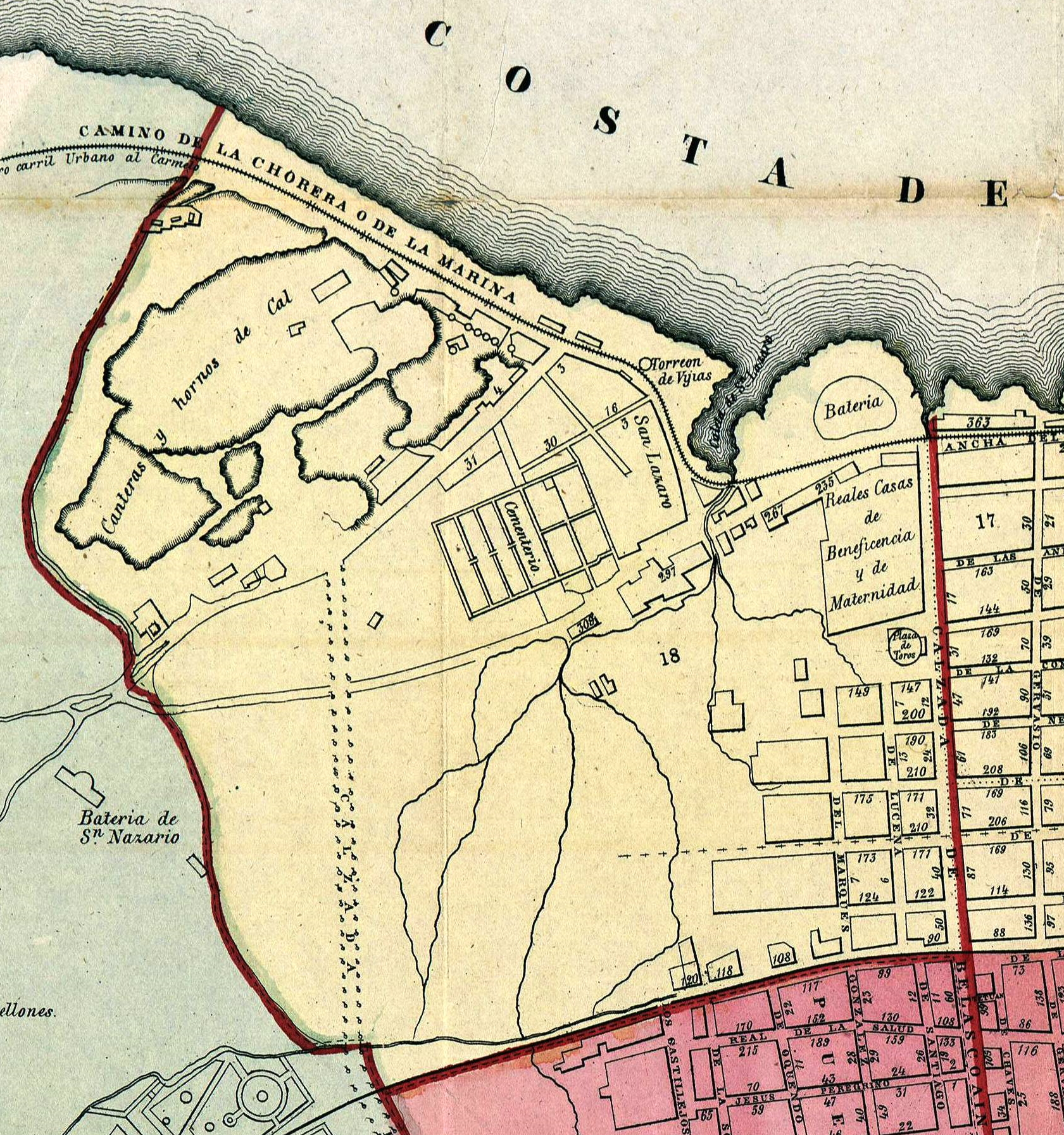
Showing the coral stone quarry adjacent to the Espada Cemetery in the Barrio de San Lázaro.

== Gallery ==
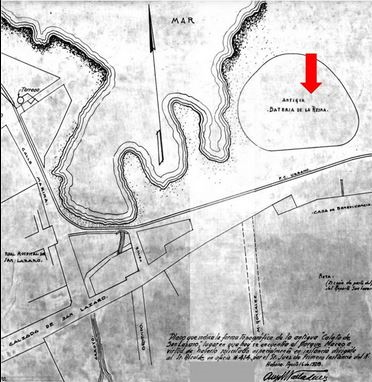
Map of the Caleta de San Lazaro showing the Batería de la Reina.

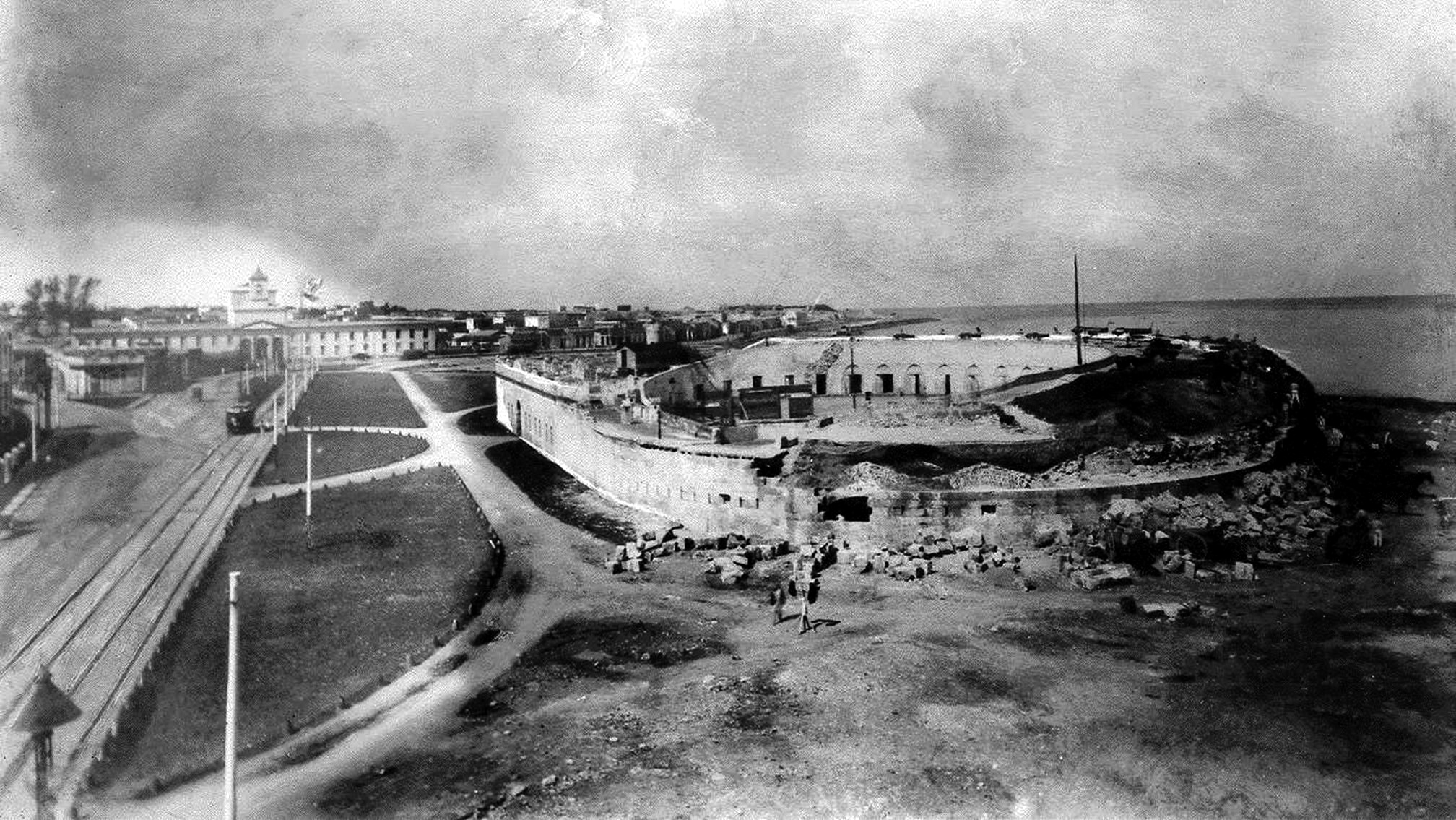
Batería de la Reina.4 demolition.

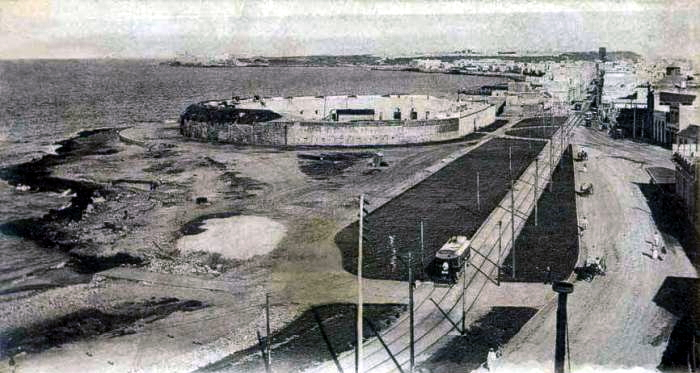
Batería de la Reina

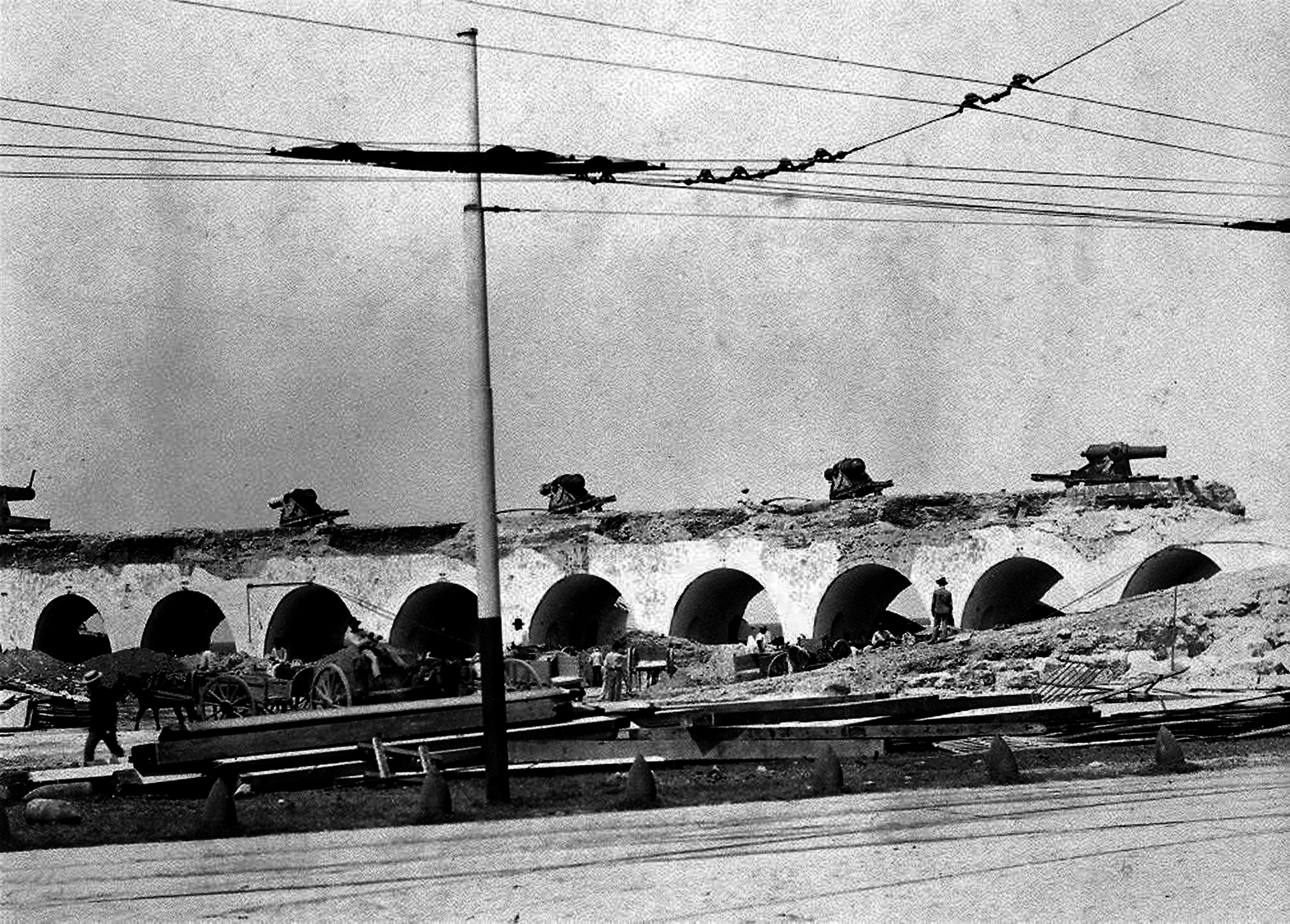
Batería de la Reina.2 demolition.

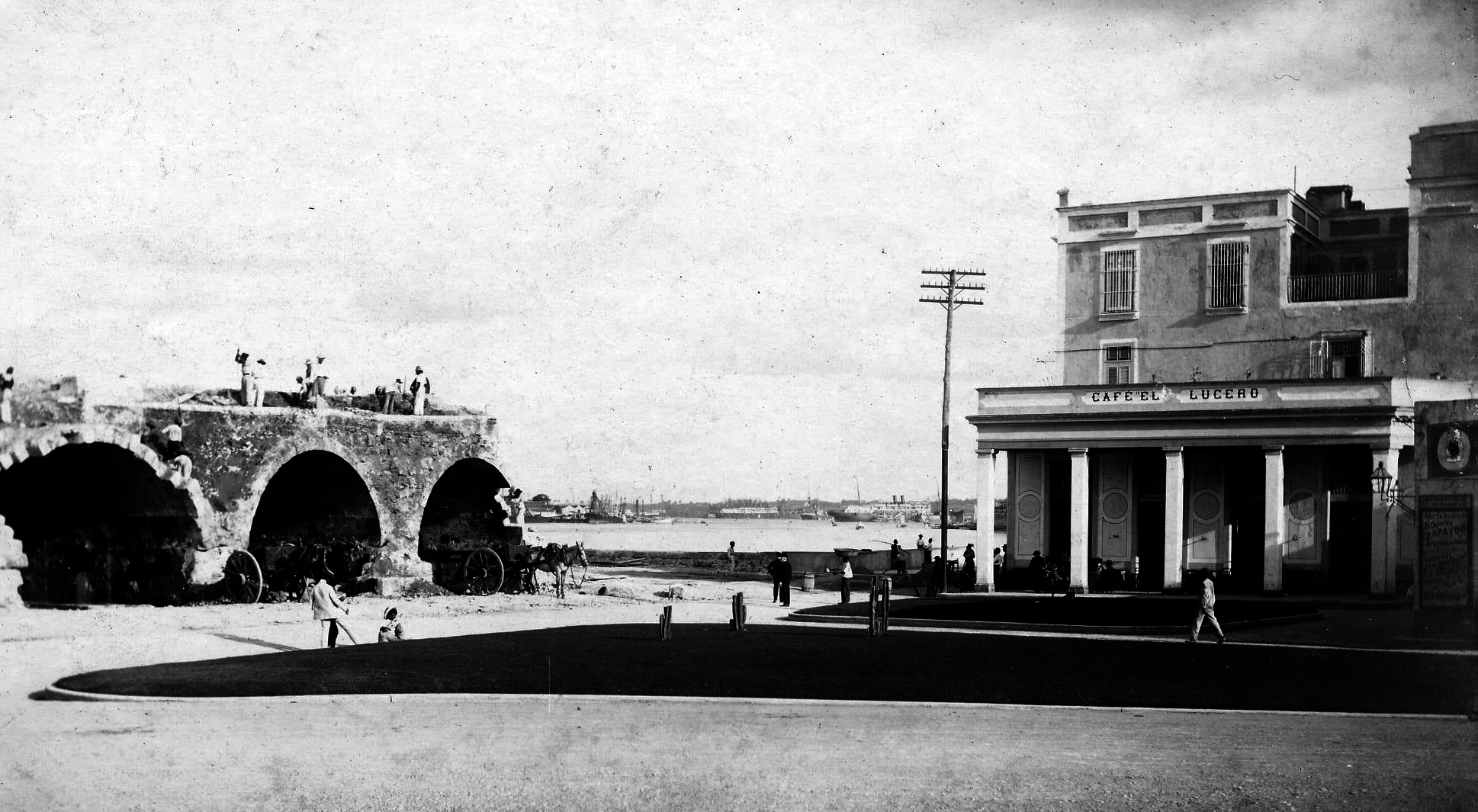
Batería de la Reina.3 demolition.

== See also ==
- Caleta de San Lazaro
- Barrio de San Lázaro, Havana
- Espada Cemetery
- La Casa de Beneficencia y Maternidad de La Habana
- Hospital de San Lázaro, Havana
- Malecón, Havana
