= Caleta de San Lazaro =

Caleta de San Lázaro
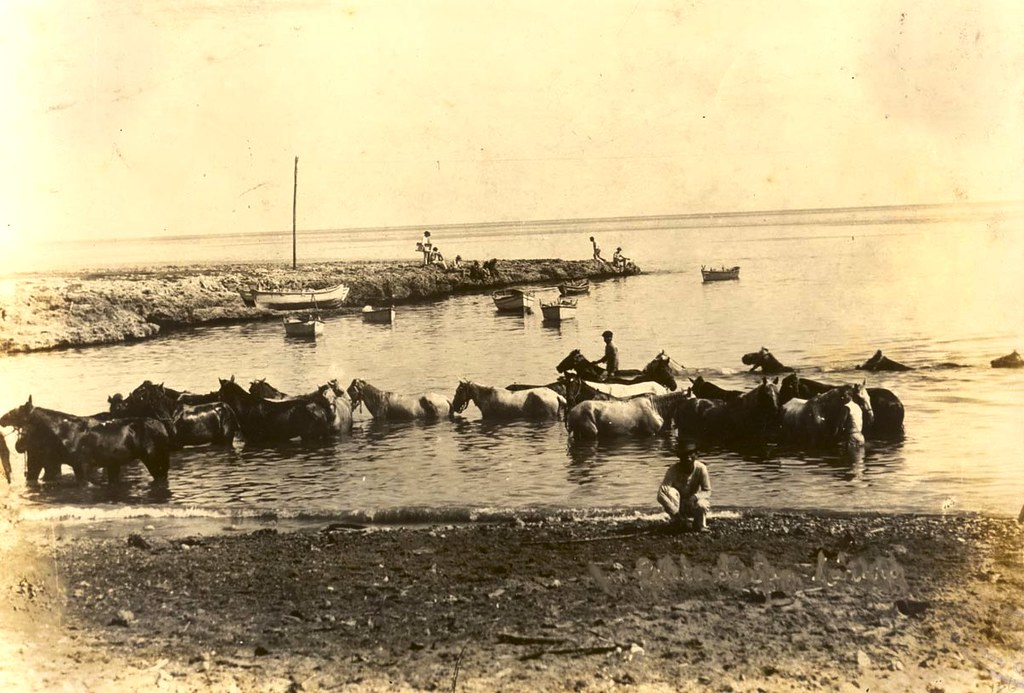
- Caleta de San Lázaro
- Interactive map of the Caleta de San Lázaro area
- Former names: Caleta de Juan Guillén

General information
- Status: Filled in in 1902
- Location: West of Centro Habana, Havana, Cuba
- Coordinates: 23.141832°N 82.371513°W

Arcabuco was the name of a footpath starting in Old Havana, in the vicinity of the church of Loma del Ángel, and ran in a westerly direction to an inlet cove of approximately 93 metres (305 ft) wide and 5.5 metres (18 ft) in depth. When Juan Guillén a Spanish soldier installed a carpentry shop to build small boats close to the cove the site became known as “La Caleta de Juan Guillén”, the road was known as “the caleta”. Eventually the Hospital de San Lázaro, the Espada Cemetery, the San Dionisio mental asylum, and La Casa de Beneficencia were developed in close proximity to the Caleta de San Lazaro.

== Dredging the Caleta of San Lazaro ==
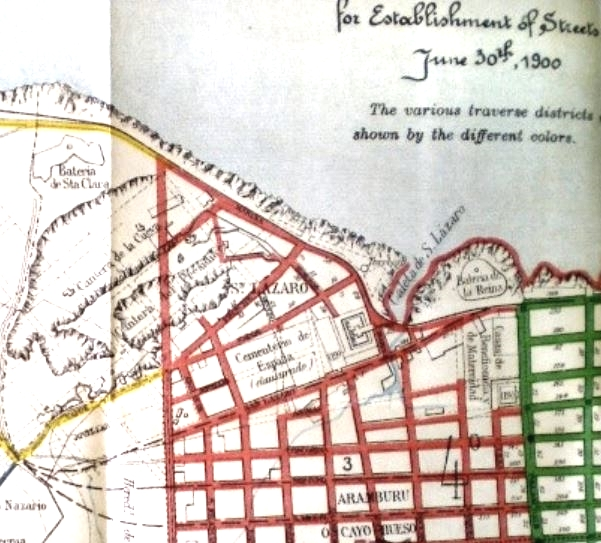
Map of 1900 showing the Caleta de S. Lazaro

In 1916 the dredging of the Caleta of San Lazaro began, in September the 1919 Florida Keys hurricane hit Havana and the rise in sea level raised the inland stretch that had been artificially created, the flood almost reached the Casa de la Beneficencia. In 1921, dredging was resumed and the construction of the Malecón wall began from the Torreón de San Lázaro to the current 23rd Street, the section was completed in 1923.

== See also ==
- Barrio de San Lázaro, Havana
- Espada Cemetery
- La Casa de Beneficencia y Maternidad de La Habana
- Hospital de San Lázaro, Havana
- Malecón, Havana
- Timeline of Havana
