= Hermanos Ameijeiras Hospital =

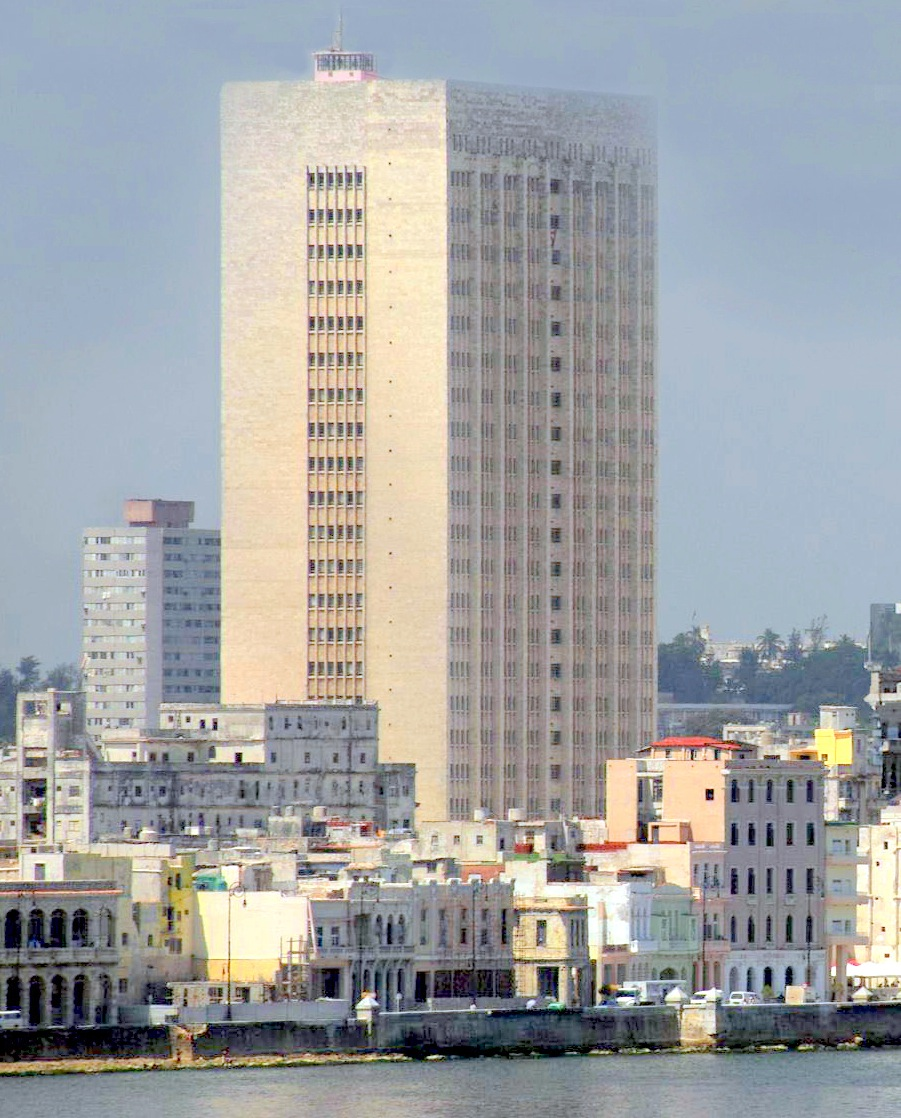
- Hospital Hermanos Ameijeiras seen from Old Havana; in front of the hospital's tower is the Malecón

Geography
- Location: Havana, Cuba
- Coordinates: 23.139606°N 82.371011°W

History
- Opened: 1982

Links
- Lists: Hospitals in Cuba

The Hermanos Ameijeiras Hospital, officially the Hospital Clínico Quirúrgico "Hermanos Ameijeiras", is located in Barrio San Lazaro and is the premier hospital in Cuba, its tower prominently visible from the Malecón between the historic center and the uptown Vedado neighborhood. It was opened in 1982.

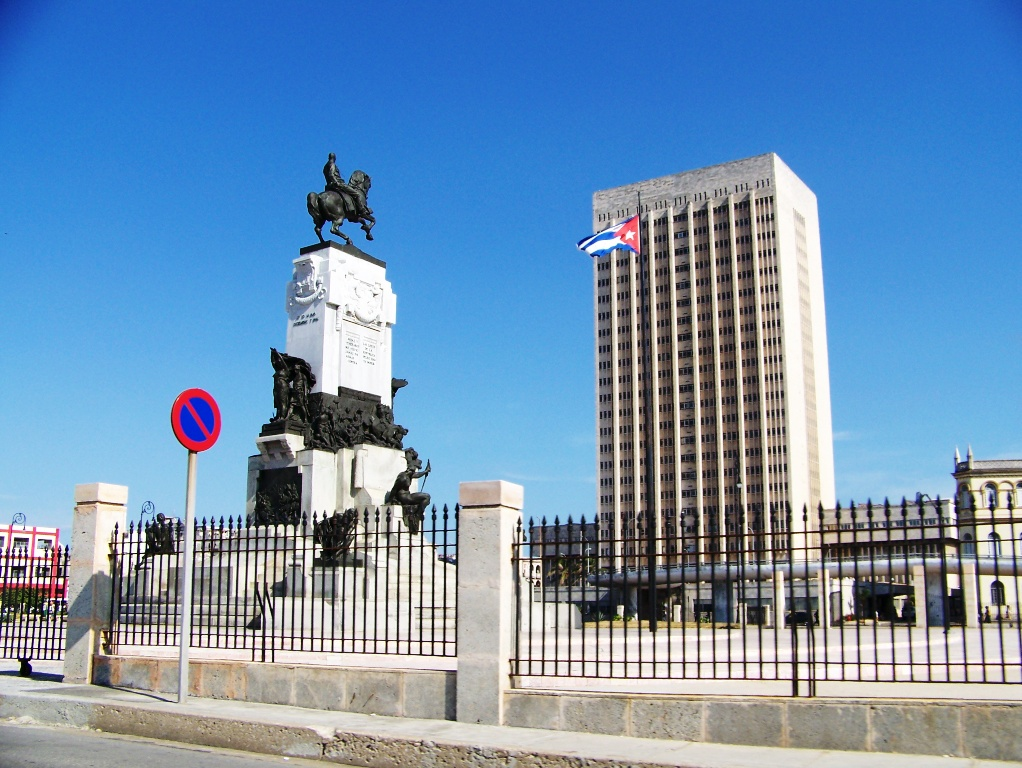
Hermanos Ameijeras Hospital, with monument to Antonio Maceo

The hospital is located at San Lázaro and Belascoaín streets in Centro Habana. It has a footprint of 35,500 square metres (8.8 acres), and 79,500 square metres (856,000 sq ft) of floor space. The monumental lobby measures 75 metres (246 ft) by 45 metres (148 ft) with a 15-metre-high (49 ft) ceiling and murals by Romanian-Cuban artist Sandú Darié.

== History ==
=== Origin and name ===
The site of the hospital (originally the Bank) was occupied from 1852 until the 1950s by La Casa de Beneficencia y Maternidad de La Habana. At the time of the Revolution in 1959, the building was only partially completed - it was to be the Banco Nacional de Cuba and some of its dependencies such as the Stock Exchange. The decision was eventually made to complete the construction and turn it into a hospital, which was finally opened in 1982, 23 years later.

The hospital was named after the Ameijeiras Brothers, which the Cuban state considers to be heroes of the Revolution. Efigenio Ameijeiras was one of them.

=== Corruption incident ===
In 1999 the Miami Herald reported that a government crackdown on corruption had extended to Hermanos Ameijeiras, uncovering that three top officials there had mishandled hard-currency income and as a result were fired or forced to resign.

=== 2007 film ===
In the 2007 film Sicko by Michael Moore, Moore took a group of Americans to Cuba to show that the quality of care that they would receive there, this to prove a point that a socialized medical system could provide the patients better care than they would receive in the U.S., where those patients would not have money or insurance to pay for good care in the private U.S. health care system. Moore insisted in the movie as well as in an interview with John Stossel of ABC News that the treatment provided was just like that given to any Cuban; but Stossel's research led him to conclude that the hospital provided service only for the Cuban elite and that this care was not available to the average Cuban.

In 2010, dissident Orlando Zapata died at the hospital after a hunger strike.
