= La Casa de Beneficencia y Maternidad de La Habana =

Former orphanage in Cuba

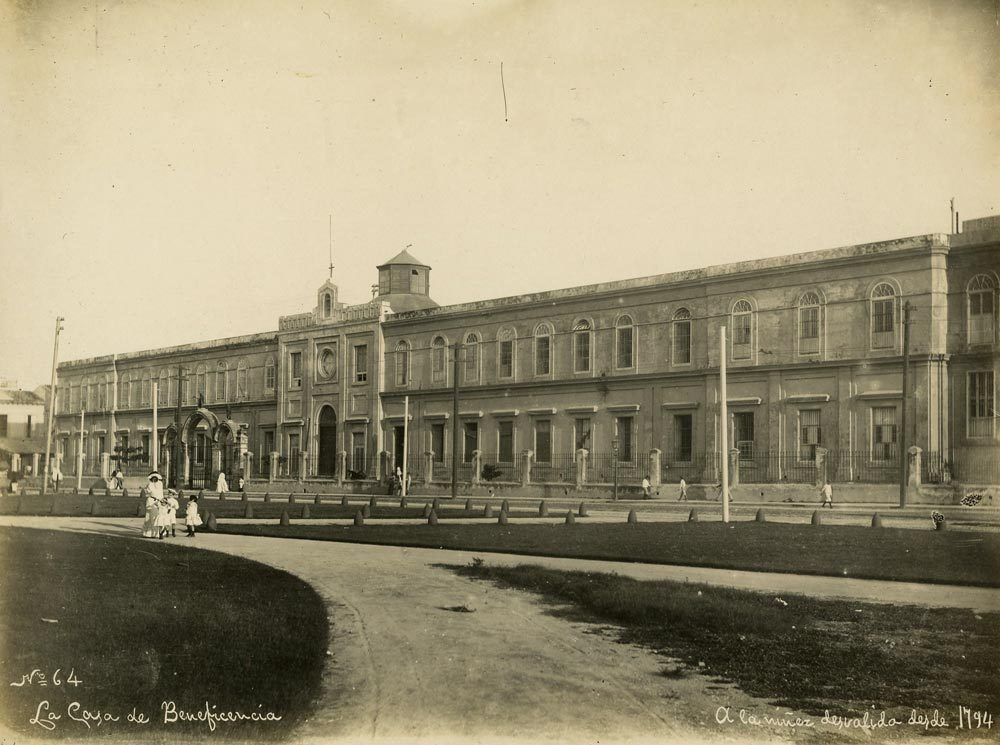
- View from San Lazaro
- Interactive map of the La Casa de Beneficencia y Maternidad de La Habana area

General information
- Type: Religious charity
- Architectural style: Neo-classical
- Location: Cayo Hueso, San Lazaro y Belascoáin, Ciudad de La Habana, Cuba
- Coordinates: 23°08′26.5″N 82°22′16.3″W
- Named for: La Casa Cuna
- Construction started: 1794
- Demolished: between 1959 and 1982

Height
- Height: 16.74 meters (54.9 ft)

Technical details
- Structural system: Load bearing
- Material: Masonry, wood
- Floor count: 2
- Grounds: 360,000 square feet (33,000 m^{2})

Design and construction
- Architect: Francisco Vambitelli

La Casa de Beneficencia y Maternidad de La Habana, (The House of Charity and Maternity of Havana) was for 270 years Havana's repository of Havana's unwanted children. The House of Charity started during a time when Cuba was experiencing extreme poverty, unemployment, and corruption in the government. Corrupt leaders were plundering the public treasury and little attention was given to social assistance, health, education, or the protection of the poor: "los desamparados".

== History ==
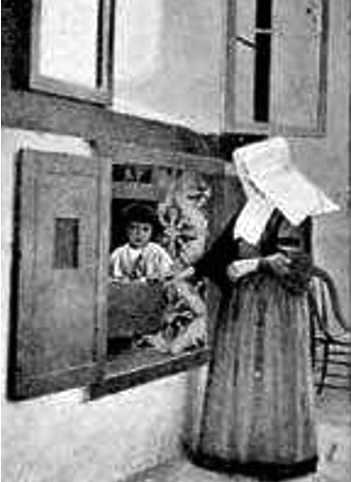
The mothers, who abandoned their child for economic reasons or because of the shame of being a single mother, could deliver their child through a Baby hatch without showing their face or revealing their identity. Photo of 1910 in the Casa de Beneficencia, Havana.

The Real Casa de Maternidad y Beneficencia emerged as a product of several transitions between "La Casa Cuna," the "Real Casa de Maternidad", and finally "La Casa de Beneficencia." It was not until 1794 during the government of Luis de las Casas that the Beneficencia was located in its final location in Barrio San Lazaro at the corners of San Lazaro and Belascoáin.

The Casa Cuna was founded in 1687 by Bishop Diego Evelino Hurtado de Compostela. His death left the orphanage unfinished due to lack of resources to carry out his efforts. His successor, Bishop Fray Gerónimo de Nosti y Valdés, took up his idea and restored the Casa Cuna in a building he built on the corner of Oficios and Muralla. It originally housed two hundred orphans.

In the year 1792, Don Luis de Peñalver, on the initiative of the Countess of Jaruco, the Marquises of Cárdenas de Monte Hermoso, the Marquis of Casa Peñalver and the Bishop of the Provinces of Louisiana and Florida, founded the "Real Casa de Beneficencia." It accepted only females, settling in a cavalry room of land located in front of the San Lázaro cove, which was an area known as the Betancourt Garden that the Bishop of Peñalver gave for this purpose. They offered to contribute 36 thousand pesos, requesting the governor to manage the royal approval and suggest the land in front of the Caleta de San Lázaro with a view to the sea and running waters.

Antonia María Menocal, a lady of Havana, left at the time of her death in 1830 a large legacy to be invested in charitable works. The executor assigned it to the creation of a Maternity House and for the preservation and education of children up to the age of six.

Marcial Dupierris in 1857 wrote: "The Real Casa de Beneficencia, which is also in the neighborhood of San Lazaro, is a large building, whose front faces the street Wide North, its side E. is on the road of Belascoaín, and extends to the S to face with the house of health of San Leopoldo, said Real establishment, is the refuge of the orphans of both secured [sic]. He is educated and supported until the age when he allows them to be applied to any kind of work. In one of the departments of their dependency there are the insane; in another the Cradle house—that is, in the spitting room. [sic] Those different departments are entrusted to the care of people who enjoy the best reputation. Of getting married, they receive a dowry of five hundred pesos that the house gives them, and when they are placed for the service of private homes, it is with the preceding report and recommendation of good reputation and morality of the people to whose care they are delivered."

La Casa de Maternidad was added to the Beneficiencia on the initiative of Spanish Governor Manuel Gutiérrez de la Concha, who administered the island from 1850 to 1852. La Casa de Beneficencia y Maternidad was administered by the Sociedad Económica de Amigos del País.

In 1914, the State assumed the institution which continued to survive on the alms and the service of the Daughters of Charity of Cuba.

The Hermanos Ameijeiras Hospital, the largest health facility in the country, was built in place of the former La Casa de Beneficencia. (Note: In the late 1950s, the Batista government purchased the building. It would be demolished and the headquarters of the National Bank would be built on those lands. The Charity building was demolished and construction of the Bank began. One day that work was paralyzed when immense vaults had already been built to store the nation's funds, on top of what was done for the banking facility, the Hermanos Ameijeiras Hospital was built. It was necessary to find a new place for the accommodation of the foundlings, part of the students were in the buildings of Triscornia, and then, they were transferred to the Dupont building that was on the corner of Lucerna and San Lázaro. In 1960 it was decided to install them in what had been the Military Civic Institute, in Ceiba del Agua, giving the name of Ciudad Hogar Granma to the new facility. Then, in 1963, when the General Antonio Maceo Interarms School was founded in the facility, some of the students were assigned to the nascent Scholarship Plan of the revolutionary government, the rest of the students, the minority that had the surname Valdés, were placed in some houses in the neighborhood of Miramar under the tutelage of Celia Sánchez, calling them from that moment, Sons of the Homeland. Currently, these children without filial protection are in foster homes distributed in each province and their attention is attended directly by the state.)

== Diego Evelino Hurtado de Compostela ==
Bishop Diego Evelino Hurtado Vélez (1638 in Santiago de Compostela, Spain - August 29, 1704 in Havana, Cuba) was the Bishop of Diocese of Santiago de Cuba (now the Archdiocese of Santiago de Cuba) and was known as Bishop Diego Evelino Hurtado de Compostela.

In 1687 he founded La Casa de Beneficencia y Maternidad de La Habana. On June 4, 1685, he was appointed Bishop of Santiago de Cuba by Pope Innocent XI and was ordained bishop on August 29, 1704, by Cardinal Savo Millini, Apostolic Nuncio to Spain. He donated his orchard in Havana for the building of Convent of Belén (later used as the Colegio de Belén). He died in Havana on August 29, 1704.

== Building ==
The building commanded certain moral and strategic positions in its philanthropic and charitable mission of providing aid to unwanted children, and in its geographic location as the first building of the first new city lot in the Barrio de San Lázaro. The Casa de Beneficencia in time reached from Calles San Lazaro and Belascoáin to Marquez Gonzalez and Virtudes where the Jai alai fronton was located. "Beneficencia had two gates, the front that overlooked San Lázaro street with a large garden. The right part of that building (facing north), corresponded to the chapel that was always open to the public. To the left of the main entrance were the school offices followed by the barbershop and other workshops. The students were never in those gardens where there was only the possibility of visual contact with them. The other gate that served as access to the vehicles only, was in the back of the school, that is, in Virtudes Street between Belascoaín and Lucena. On the right (always facing north), part of the building was located dedicated to the classrooms, and on its left was the hospital. This school was converted into a barracks...they took us out of there to turn it into the Antonio Maceo military school."

The Casa de Beneficencia eventually reached from Calles San Lazaro and Belascoáin to Marquez Gonzalez and Virtudes where the jai alai fronton was located. A former orphan described the place:

"(the) Beneficencia had two gates; the front that overlooked San Lázaro street with a large garden. The right part of that building (facing north), corresponded to the chapel that was always open to the public. To the left of the main entrance were the school offices followed by the barber shop and other workshops. The students were never in those gardens where there was only the possibility of a visual contact with them. The other gate that served as access to the vehicles only was in the back of the school; that is, on Virtudes Street between Belascoaín and Lucena. On the right (always facing north), part of the building was located dedicated to the classrooms and on its left was the hospital... This magnificent school was converted into a barracks... they took us out of there to turn it into the Antonio Maceo military school."

According to Fidel Castro "When the Revolution triumphed, it was (the new bank building) in the foundations, perhaps on the first or second floors."

=== Tradition ===
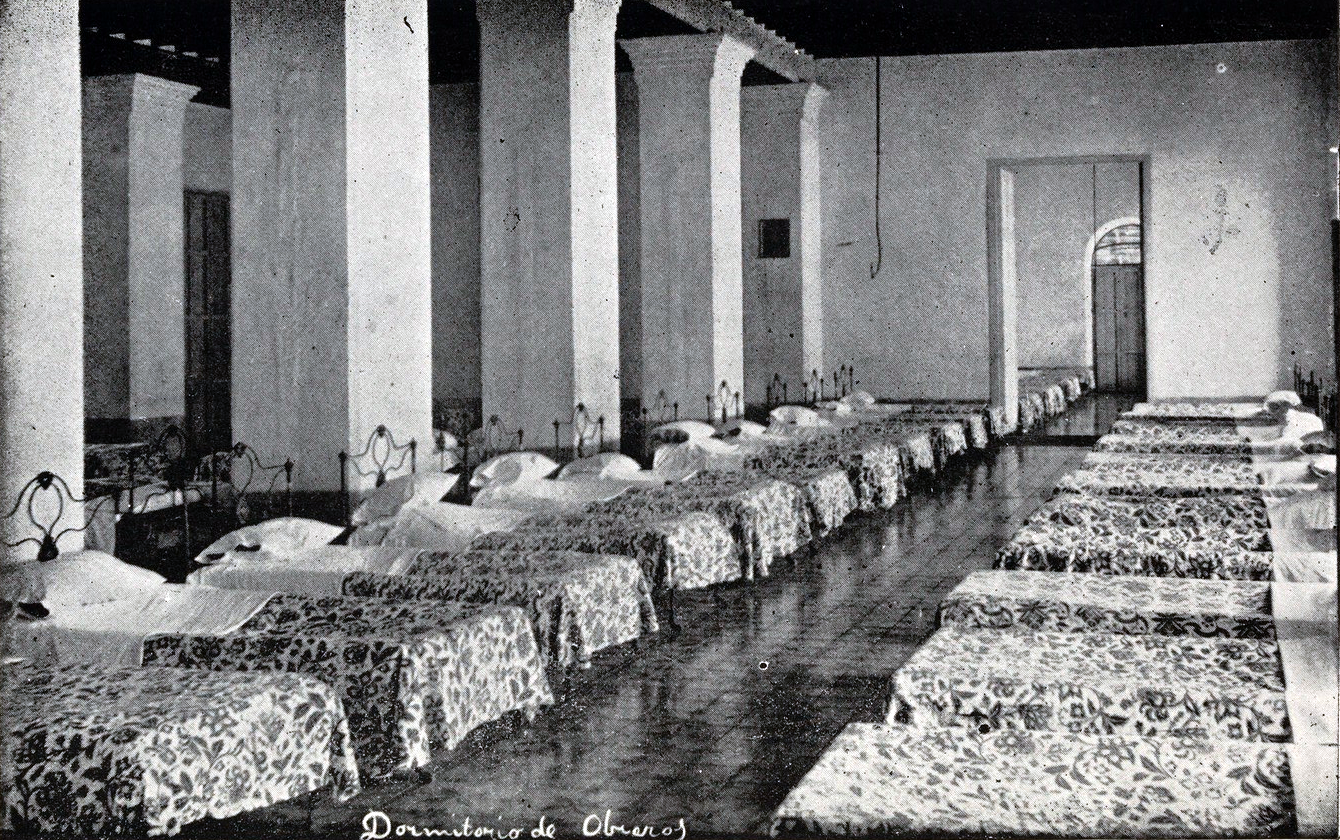
The orphanage's dormitory in 1900, Havana.

Children who had no last name were given the surname Valdés upon entering the charity. The name derived from Bishop Fray Gerónimo de Nosti y Valdés, successor of Diego Evelino Hurtado de Compostela. Bishop Fray Gerónimo de Nosti y Valdés is buried at Iglesia del Espíritu Santo, Havana in La Habana Vieja. Mothers who abandoned their children for economic reasons or for the shame of being a single mother, could deliver them without showing their face or revealing their identity. (Note: "… For that, on the side of the building that faces Calle Belascoaín, there was the lathe. The infant was placed in it and the tank turned at the touch of a bell. On the other side, I received the abandoned child from a nun from the Sisters of Charity of St. Vincent de Paul, a congregation that attended that semi-private institution that tried to replace the official incuria in its attempt to redeem evils that the State did not suppress or remedy ... ".) Ciro Bianchi Ross wrote: "For that, in the side façade of the building that faced the Belascoaín Road, there was the lathe; the infant was placed in it and the deposit was turned at the touch of a bell, and on the other side the abandoned child received a nun from the Sisters of Charity of Saint Vincent de Paul, a congregation that served that semi-private institution that tried to supply the official lack of attention in its attempt to redeem evils that the State did not suppress or remedy..." The nuns were of the Sisters of Charity of St. Vincent de Paulo (Hermanas de la Caridad de San Vicente de Paulo), the congregation that served La Casa de Beneficencia.

== Building demolition ==
In a speech in 1982 Fidel Castro states: "We have always seen a building under construction here. This building (bank building) is an inheritance. We inherited this building at the time of the victory of the revolution. A building for the national bank was being built." A photograph published in Havana in January 1959 showing Castro's son Fidelito riding on top of a tank contradicts this statement as the Beneficiencia building can be seen in the left background of the photo.

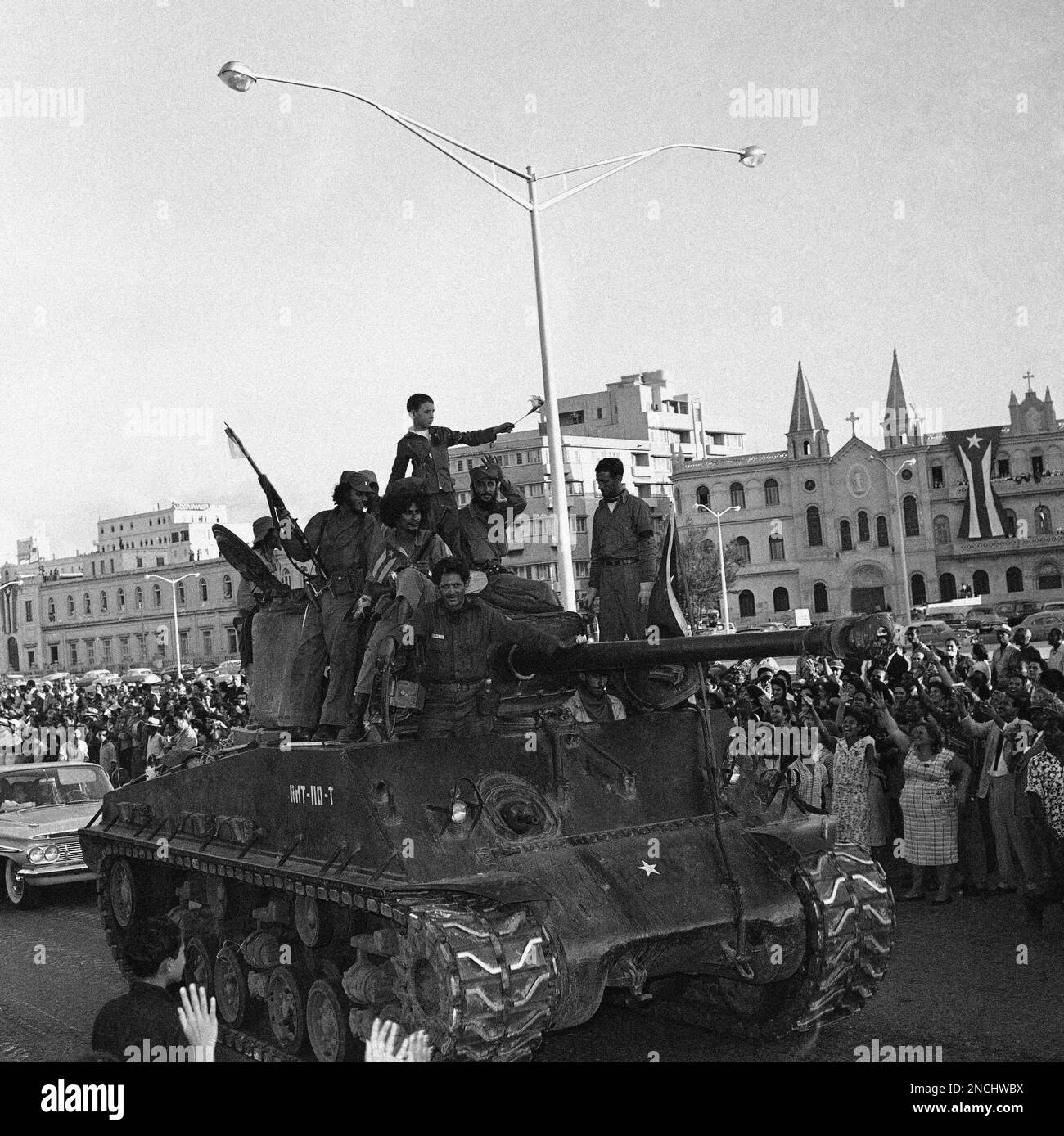
The son of Fidel Castro rides atop a tank in Havanna, Jan 8,1959

=== Baby hatch ===
Baby hatches have existed in one form or another for centuries. The system was quite common in medieval times. From 1198 the first foundling wheels (ruota dei trovatelli) were used in Italy; Pope Innocent III decreed that these should be installed in homes for foundlings so that women could leave their child in secret instead of killing them, a practice clearly evident from the numerous drowned infants found in the Tiber River. A foundling wheel was a cylinder set upright in the outside wall of the building, rather like a revolving door. Mothers placed the child in the cylinder, turned it around so that the baby was inside the church, and then rang a bell to alert caretakers. One example of this type which can still be seen today is in the Santo Spirito hospital at the Vatican City; this wheel was installed in medieval times and used until the 19th century.

In Hamburg, Germany, a Dutch merchant set up a wheel (Drehladen) in an orphanage in 1709. It closed after only five years in 1714 as the number of babies left there was too high for the orphanage to cope with financially. Other wheels are known to have existed in Kassel (1764) and Mainz (1811).

In France, foundling wheels (tours d'abandon, abandonment wheel) were introduced by Saint Vincent de Paul who built the first foundling home in 1638 in Paris. Foundling wheels were legalised in an imperial decree of January 19, 1811, and at their height, there were 251 in France, according to author Anne Martin-Fugier. They were in hospitals such as the Hôpital des Enfants-Trouvés (Hospital for Foundling Children) in Paris. However, the number of children left there rose into the tens of thousands per year, as a result of the desperate economic situation at the time, and in 1863 they were closed down and replaced by "admissions offices" where mothers could give up their child anonymously but could also receive advice. The tours d'abandon were officially abolished in law of June 27, 1904. Today in France, women are allowed to give birth anonymously in hospitals (accouchement sous X) and leave their baby there.

In Brazil and Portugal, foundling wheels (roda dos expostos/enjeitados, literally "wheel for exposed/rejected ones") were also used after Queen Maria I proclaimed on May 24, 1783, that all towns should have a foundling hospital. One example was the wheel installed at the Santa Casa de Misericordia hospital in São Paulo on July 2, 1825. This was taken out of use on June 5, 1949, declared incompatible with the modern social system after five years' debate. A Brazilian film on this subject, Roda Dos Expostos, directed by Maria Emília de Azevedo, won an award for "Best Photography" at the Festival de Gramado in 2001.

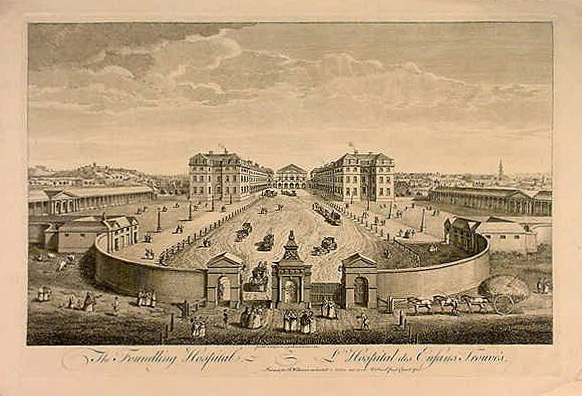
Foundling Hospital in London

In Britain and Ireland, foundlings were brought up in orphanages financed by the Poor Tax. The home for foundlings in London was established in 1741; in Dublin the Foundling Hospital and Workhouse installed a foundling wheel in 1730, as this excerpt from the Minute Book of the Court of Governors of that year shows:

"Hu (Boulter) Armach, Primate of All-Ireland, being in the chair, ordered that a turning-wheel, or convenience for taking in children, be provided near the gate of the workhouse; that at any time, by day or by night, a child may be layd in it, to be taken in by the officers of the said house."

The foundling wheel in Dublin was taken out of use in 1826 when the Dublin hospital was closed because of the high death rate of children there.

== Legacy ==
La Casa de Beneficencia inspired the protagonist of Cecilia Valdés, written by Cirilo Villaverde. Cecilia Valdés is also the protagonist of Reinaldo Arenas's La Loma del Ángel. Real characters that flourished from La Casa de Beneficencia were: the poet Gabriel de la Concepción Valdés (Plácido), the priest Fray José Olallo Valdés, and the doctor Juan Bautista Valdés, among others.

== Gallery ==
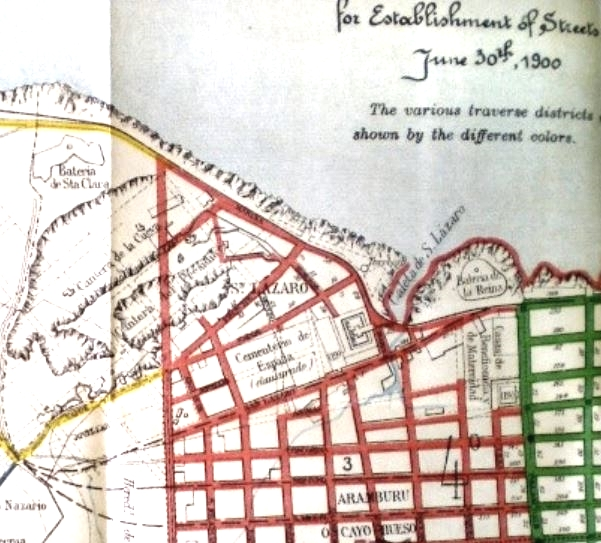
1900 map, Hospital de San Lázaro, Cemetery, Casa de Beneficencia, Batería de la Reina, the canteras, and the Caleta de S. Lazaro

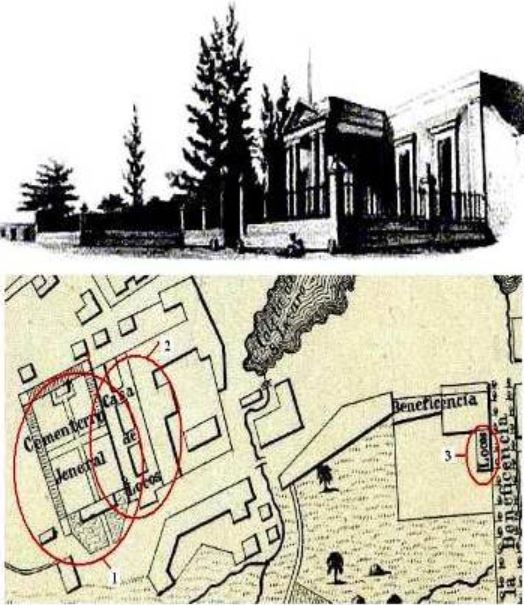
1855 map showing hospital San Dionisio, Casa de Beneficencia, Espada Cemetery

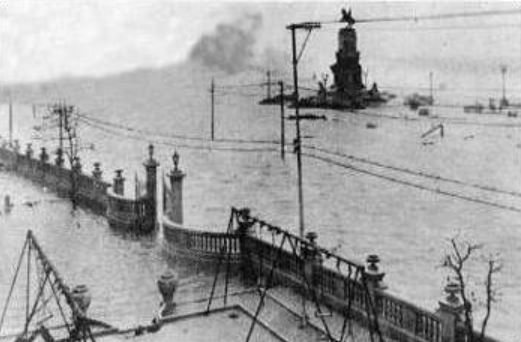
Casa de Beneficencia during the cyclone of 1919, Antonio Maceo in the background.

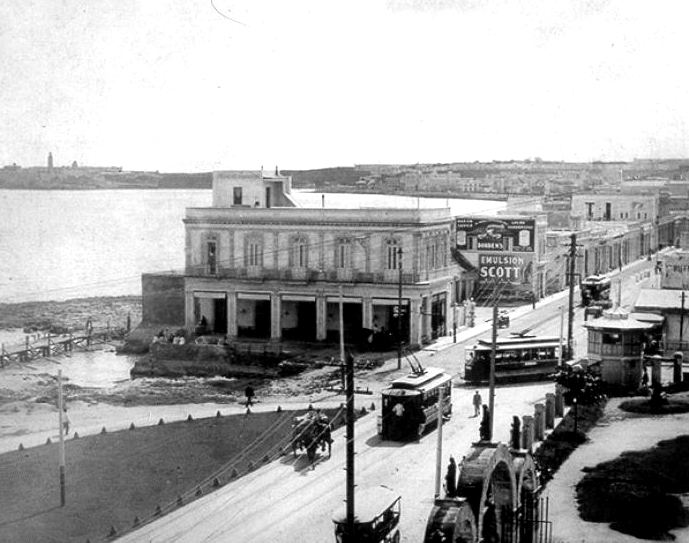
Café Vista Alegre. San Lázaro y Belascoáin. Front lawn of Casa de Beneficencia. ca 1900

View from San Lázaro and Belascoáin.

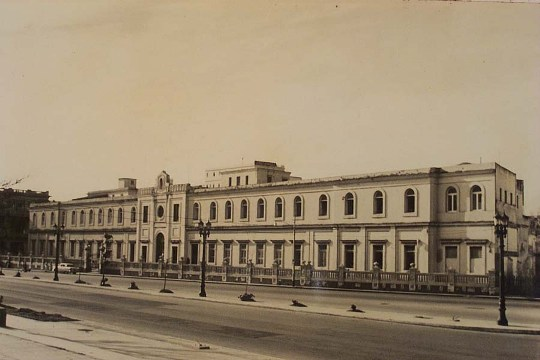
La Casa de Beneficencia from Calle San Lázaro

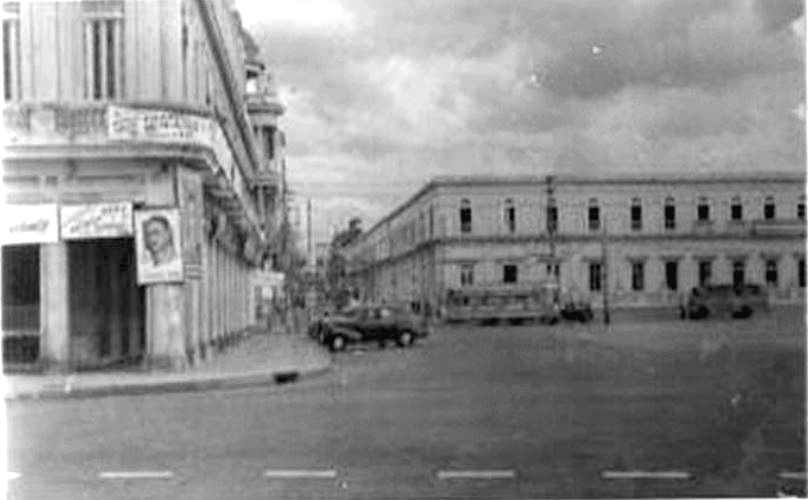
Casa de Beneficencia from Belascoáin y Malecón 1940s

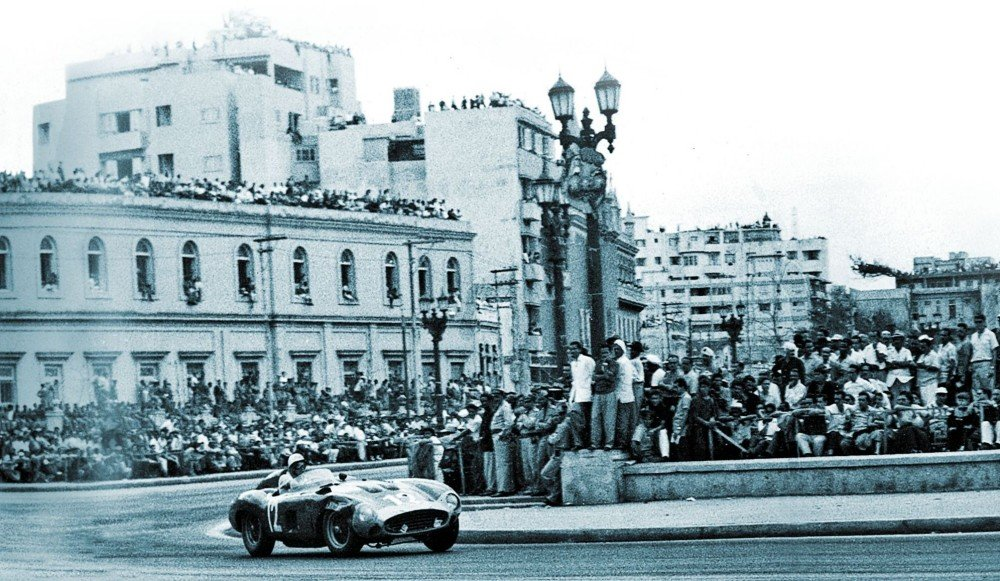
Casa de Beneficencia. Cuban Grand Prix. 1957

== See also ==
- Barrio de San Lázaro, Havana
- Batería de la de la Reina
- Caleta de San Lazaro
- Hospital de San Lázaro, Havana
- Havana Jai alai
- Hermanos Ameijeiras Hospital
- Child abandonment
