= Hospital de San Lázaro, Havana =

Hospital de San Lázaro
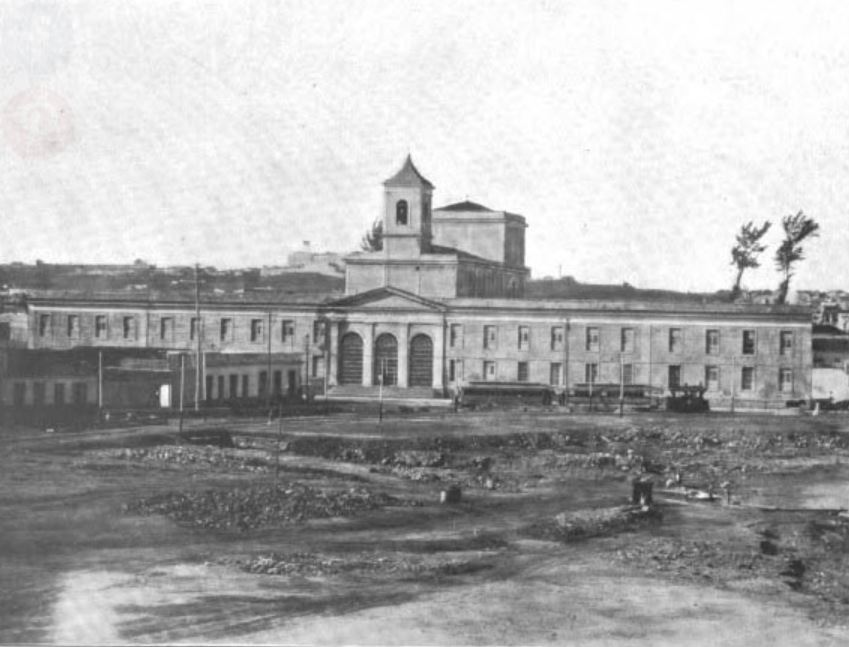
- Interactive map of the Hospital de San Lázaro area

General information
- Status: Demolished
- Type: Hospital
- Location: Barrio de San Lázaro, Calle Marina, Havana, Cuba
- Coordinates: 23.140853°N 82.375349°W
- Inaugurated: 1781
- Relocated: December 26, 1916
- Closed: 1916

Height
- Antenna spire: 50 feet

Technical details
- Structural system: Load bearing masonry
- Material: Stone (brick?)
- Floor count: 2

Design and construction
- Known for: First leper hospital in Cuba

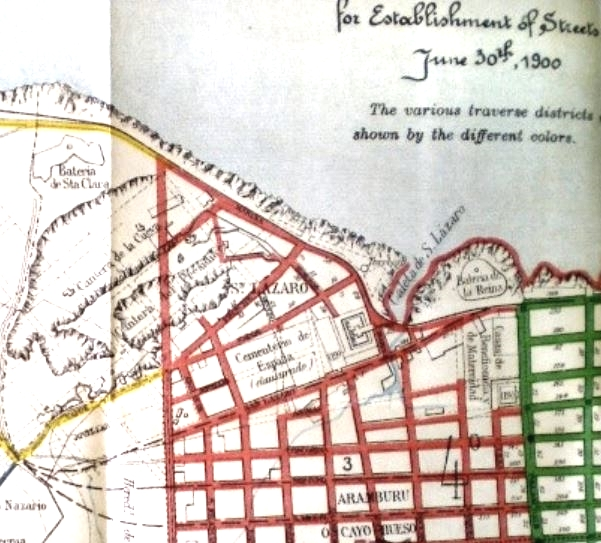
Map of 1900 showing Hospital de San Lazaro, Espada Cemetery La Casa de Beneficencia y Maternidad de La Habana, The Batreria de La Reina, the Caleta de S. Lazaro and las canteras

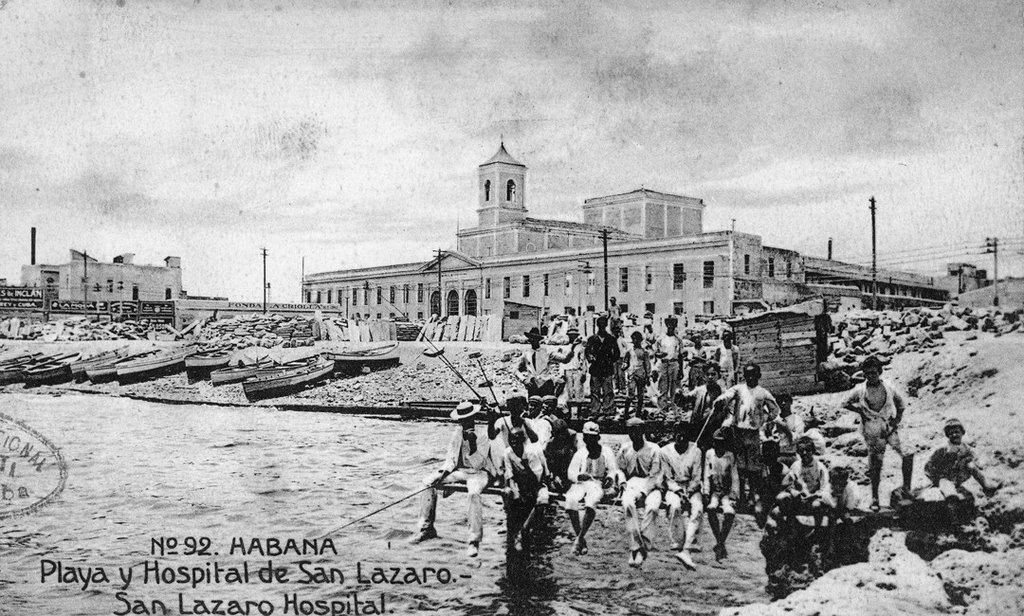

Hospital de San Lázaro was a hospital in the city of Havana, Cuba. It dates back to the 17th century, when it served as headquarters for some huts built near the Caleta de Juan Guillén, then known as Caleta de San Lázaro, in an area about a mile outside the city walls.

== History ==
In view of the deplorable situation of the leprosy patients, the chaplain of the hospital presbyter Juan Pérez de Silva and Dr. Francisco Teneza went to the King of Spain, His Majesty Philip V of Spain, asking for his help. The Real Hospital de San Lázaro, built on the Juan Guillén Cove in 1781 and the church inside the two-story building became a pilgrimage frequented by those suffering from leprosy and followers of San Lázaro or Babalú Ayé seeking spiritual solace.

== Site ==
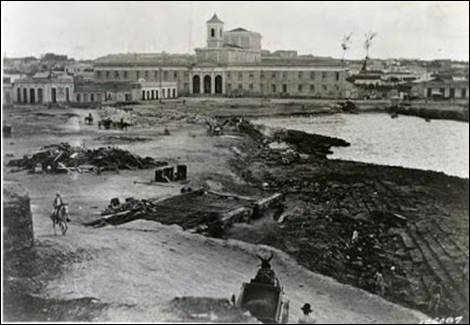
The hospital was close to the Espada Cemetery, the San Dionisio mental asylum, and La Casa de Beneficencia y Maternidad de La Habana, and all were close to the Caleta de Juan Guillén which was filled in during the initial construction of the Malecon in 1901.

The site of San Lázaro Hospital was on Calle Aramburu between Calles Jovellar and San Lázaro. The hospital was close to the Espada Cemetery, the San Dionisio mental asylum, and La Casa de Beneficencia y Maternidad de La Habana, and all were close to the Caleta de Juan Guillén which was filled in during the initial construction of the Malecon in 1901. The quarry of San Lazaro where Jose Marti had been imprisoned in 1870, was to the west of Calle Principe. The former location of La Casa de Beneficencia is the current location of Hermanos Ameijeiras Hospital. The site today encompasses Cayo Hueso which is a consejo popular (ward) in the municipality of Centro Habana. A traditionally working-class neighborhood populated by Afro-Cubans, it is known for its many cultural landmarks such as the Callejón de Hamel, the Fragua Martiana Museum and the Parque de los Mártires Universitarios. Cayo Hueso formed part of Barrio San Lázaro, an area bounded by Calle Infanta to the west, Calle Zanja to the south, Calle Belascoáin to the east and the Gulf of Mexico to the north. Cayo Hueso was declared a barrio on 26 July 1912 and made part of Centro Habana upon its establishment in 1963.

== Founding ==
By a royal decree dated June 19, 1714, His Majesty Felipe V ordered the foundation of the Royal Hospital of San Lazaro. In 1781, the leprosarium was finished in the Caleta de Juan Guillén, which had two floors, with a monumental front that served as a facade to a church, located at the center of the building.

Because it was before the Malecon was built (1901) and subject exposure from the sea, various cyclones damaged the structure of the building. In addition, because of the cove, it was a site that was prone to attack. Havana was taken by the English in the Siege of Havana, a military action from March to August 1762, the siege was part of the Seven Years' War.

There were continuous complaints from the neighbors who saw in leprosy patients a source of lethal contagion endangering their lives as well as a threat to public safety. This grievance was led by the government and the representatives of the powerful urban owners who threatened to stop their investments in the area of Vedado, thus the leprosy patients were promptly removed from Barrio San Lazaro.

== Architecture ==
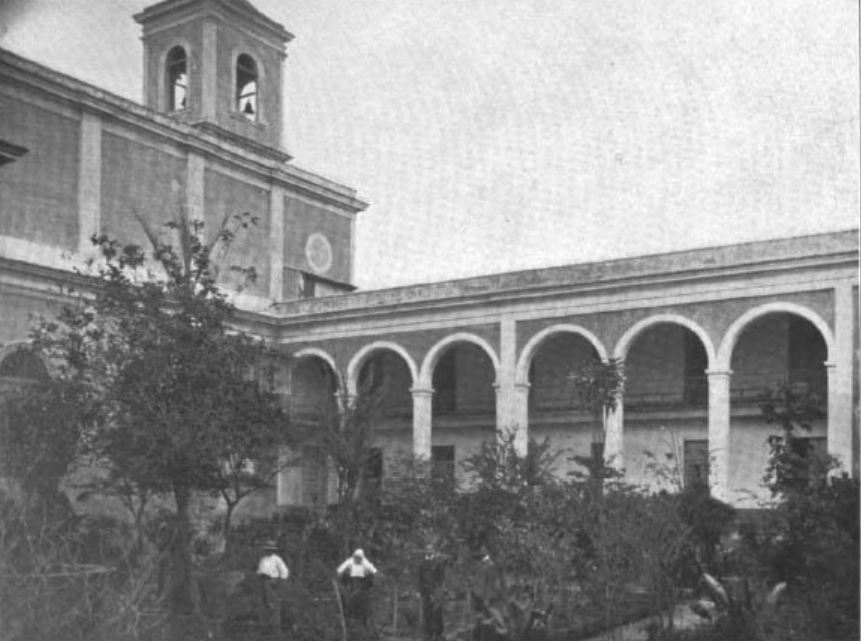

The masonry building was an architectural hybrid type: a single church inside of a courtyard with an entrance to both through a classical pediment over a tripartite portico. The placement of the church in the center, divides the courtyard into 2 equal spaces and creates equal flows of circulation, File:La Casa de Beneficencia y Maternidad de La Habana. Map of barrio San Lazaro, 1900.jpg one in front of the church and another at the rear. The passages between the two courtyards are similar in plan and section to many of the 8-meter open porticoes throughout the city . There are windows at the front exterior wall of the hospital and what appears to be a catwalk [:File:Hospital San Lazaro 1. Havana, Cuba.jpg] over rooms to access these windows in the exterior wall. The church is protected by several layers of walls so it is an ideal design against cyclones and hurricanes.

The church at the San Lazaro Hospital is a 'uninave' type composed of a single nave similar to the Espíritu Santo church and could have served as a model for the renovation in 1926 for Iglesia Santo Cristo del Buen Viaje, Havana by the architectural firm of Leonardo Morales y Pedroso, architects of El Colegio de Belen as both buildings have a similar typology of a semi-long nave with the tallest room located at the crossing and smaller rooms at the side. The room over the crossing is the most important and largest in the composition.

== 1916 transfer of patients ==
On December 26, 1916, the patients were transferred to the Mariel Lazaretto Hospital for lepers. Finally, the patients had to leave their former home, but not before receiving the commitment that they would be taken to Rincon once the work on the new leprosarium was completed. As proof of guarantee, they were accompanied by the priest Apolinar López and the religious consecrated of the order Daughters of Charity. While the works in Rincón advanced, the patients were transferred to Mariel and housed in barracks that the Spanish government had used for the quarantine of immigrants and troops, without having the minimum conditions for the existence of human beings

The Rincon is a town located about 25 miles from the center of Havana and close to Santiago de Las Vegas, belonging to the current municipality of Boyeros. This locality limits with the towns of Bejucal, San Antonio de los Baños, Wajay and Bauta, territories that until April 2011 belonged to the province of Havana. Rincon is one of the largest religious pilgrimages and on December 17 people from all over Cuba visit the church of the leper colony.

On February 26, 1917, without adequate means of transportation; In carts, plates and wooden ambulances pulled by horses or oxen, the patients were taken to the hospital in Rincón half-built, far from the city, and without resources to take care of the sick. After the strenuous journey from Mariel, the patients arrived in Rincon and found a bitter reality: the hospital consisted of a few pavilions still unfinished, in the middle of a muddy field, without running water or electricity, without streets, without nursing, and without accommodation of their religious needs. The priest Apolinar López and the superior mother, Sister Ramona Idoate, were those who, with great strength of spirit and personal sacrifice, achieved the conditioning of the place, for which they relied fundamentally on the donations and alms of devotees.

Later the first families affected by leprosy arrived and who settled there for medical treatment and patients from various other hospitals that had been closed for the purpose of concentrating the large numbers of lepers. By Law of July 31, 1917, thirty million pesos were issued in loan bonds, although the existence of the leprosarium continued to depend on the public contribution and donations of the believers.

After so many vicissitudes, the pavilions were finished and the patients lodged. The facility had 42 buildings, 13 of them for patients, and the rest for the administration, the accommodation of the religious, the church and various other necessities.

== Gallery ==
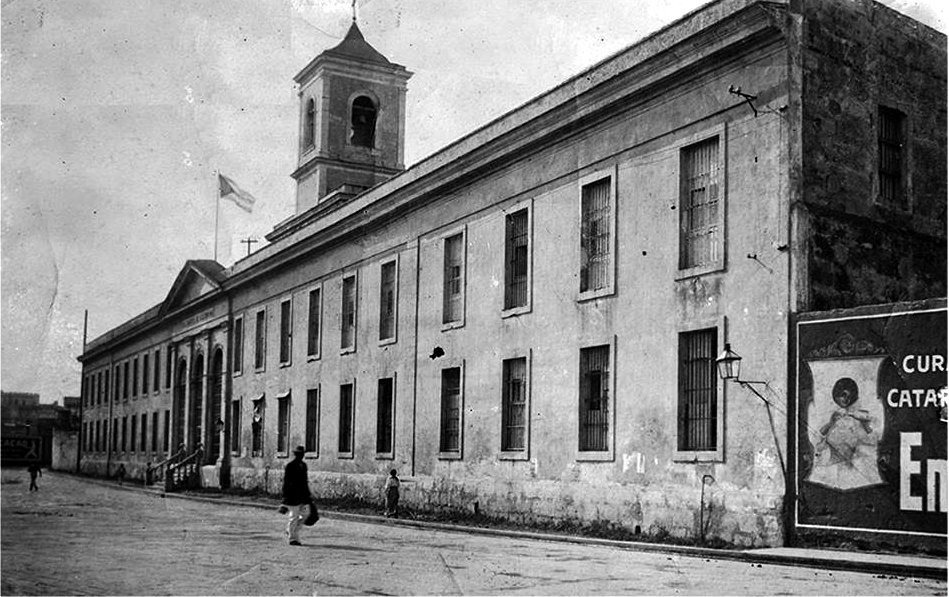

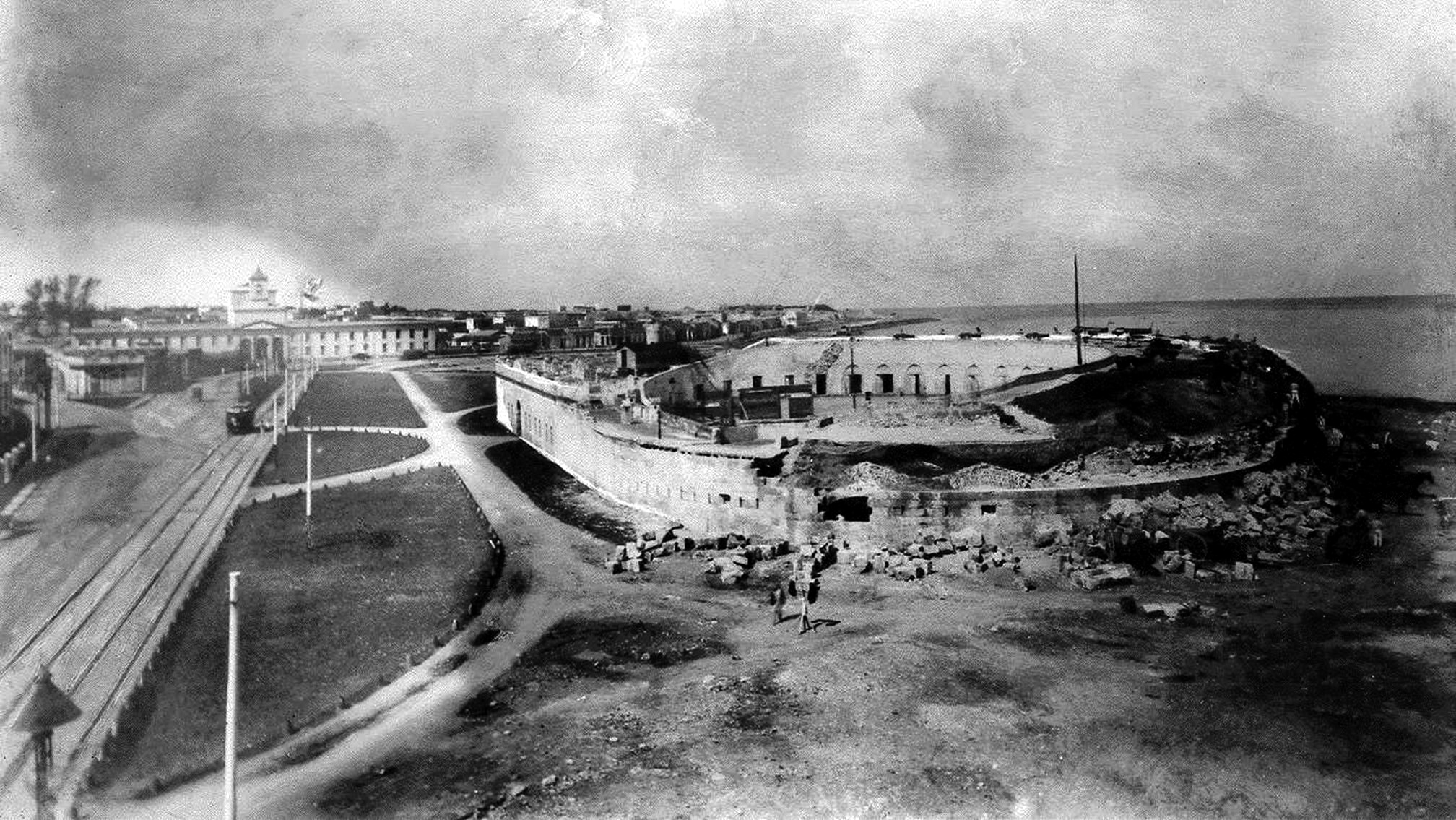
Batería de la de la Reina.4 demolition.

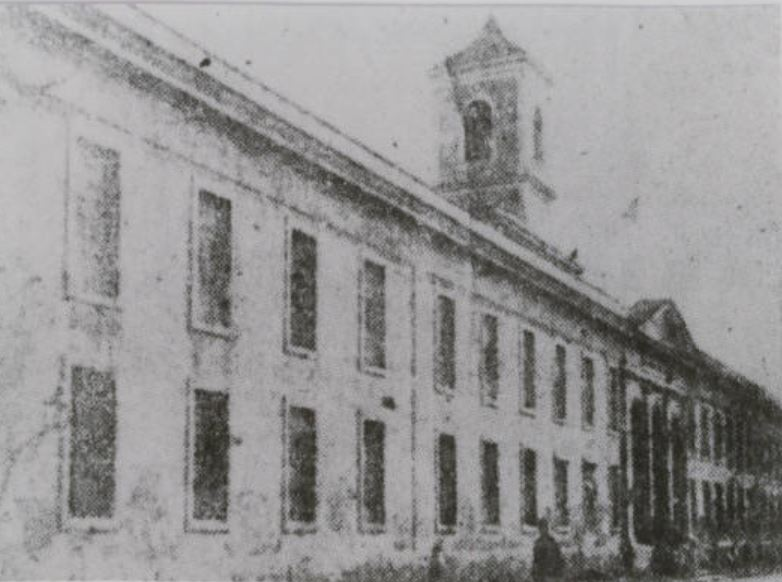
Hospital of San Lazaro

== See also ==
- Neoclassical architecture
- Barrio de San Lázaro, Havana
- Espada Cemetery
- for a similar Havana church typology
