= Malecón, Havana =

Broad esplanade, roadway and seawall in Havana, Cuba

Coordinates: 23°8′30″N 82°22′05″W

El Malecón
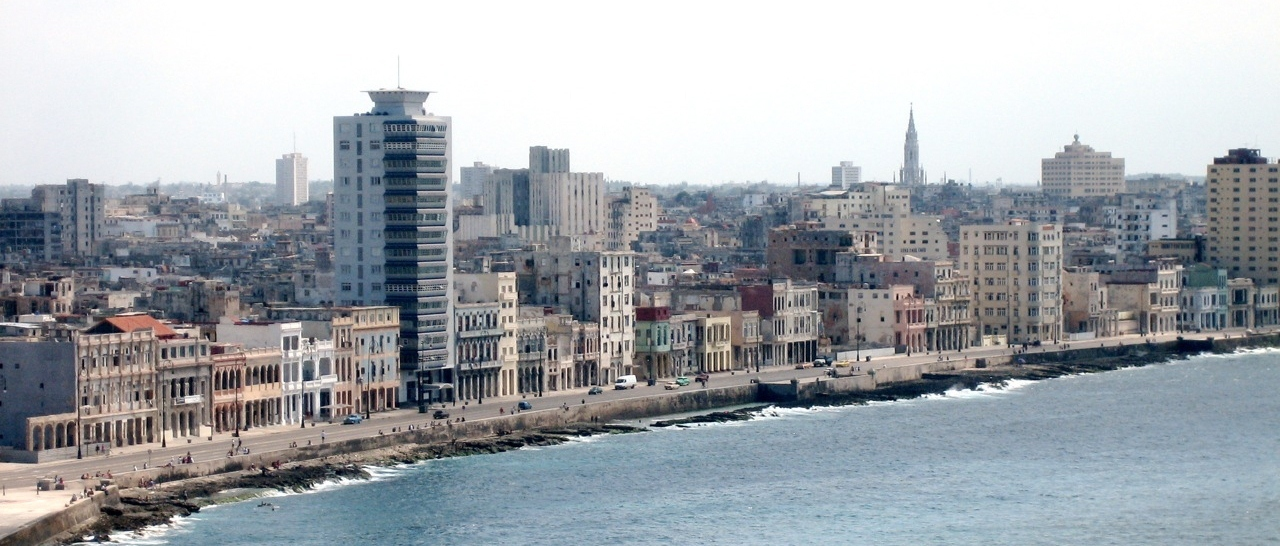

General information
- Architectural style: Modern sea wall.
- Location: Ciudad de La Habana, Cuba
- Inaugurated: 1901
- Owner: City of Havana

Height
- Height: 1 m (3 ft 3 in)

Technical details
- Material: Reinforced concrete

The Malecón (officially Avenida de Maceo) is a broad esplanade, roadway, and seawall that stretches for 8 km (5 miles) along the coast in Havana, Cuba, from the mouth of Havana Harbor in Old Havana, along the north side of the Centro Habana neighborhood and the Vedado neighborhood, ending at the mouth of the Almendares.

It was built to protect Havana from the sea, in particular the frentes fríos that whipped up the waves against the facades of the buildings on San Lazaro.

== History ==
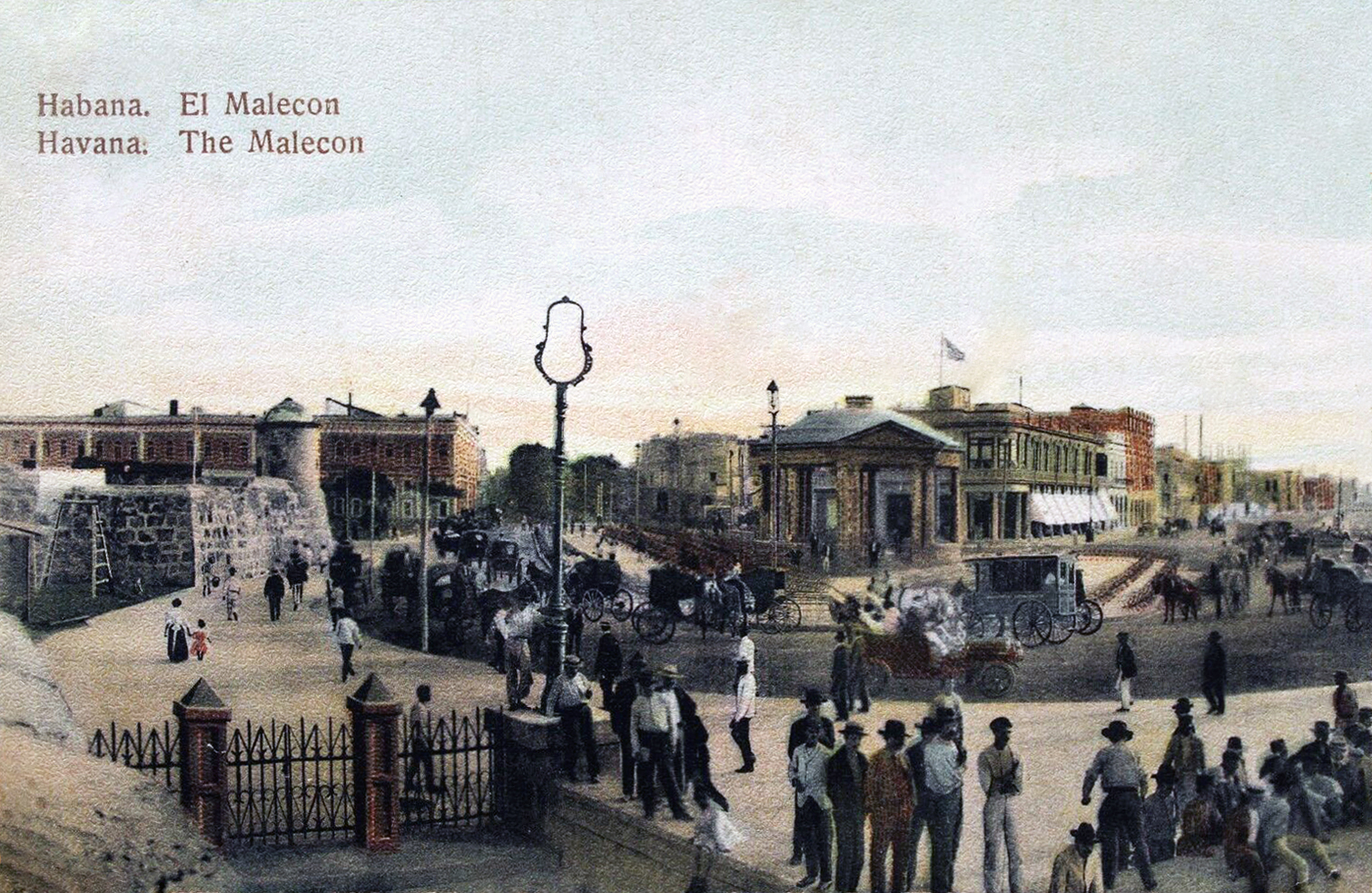
El Malecón in 1905.

Construction of the Malecón began in 1901, during temporary U.S. military rule. The main purpose of building the Malecón was to protect Havana from the sea.

To celebrate the construction of the first 500m section of the Malecón, the American government built a roundabout at the intersection of Paseo del Prado. According to architects of the period it was the first roundabout in Cuba to be constructed with steel-reinforced concrete. Bands played Cuban melodies there every Sunday. The Miramar Hotel was built in front of the roundabout. It was the first hotel in Cuba where the waiters wore tuxedos (dinner jackets) and vests (waistcoats) with gold buttons, and it was very fashionable for the first 15 years of independence. Today, the Royalton Habana hotel is located on this site.

Subsequent Cuban governments continued the extension of the first section of the Malecón. In 1923, it reached the K and L streets in Vedado, where the United States Embassy was built, near the José Martí Sports Park and, further out, the mouth of the Almendares River.

In 1957 and 1958, the roadway served as the venue of the Cuban Grand Prix.

=== Stages of completion ===
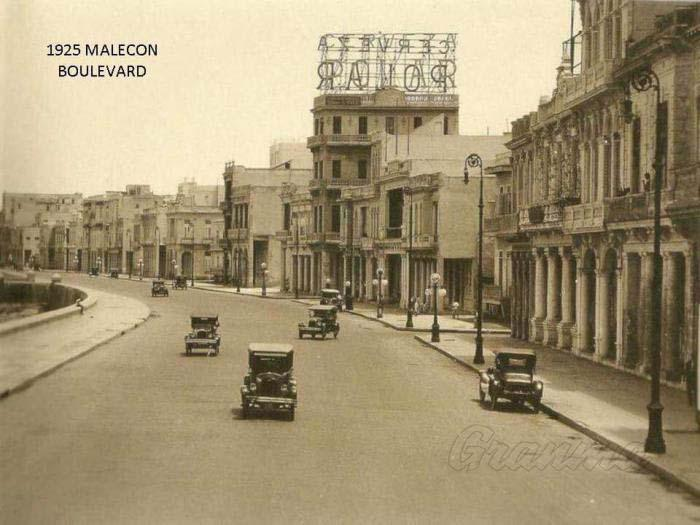
El Malecon in 1925

- In 1901 and 1902, from the Paseo del Prado to Calle Crespo
- Between 1902 and 1921 as far as the Monument to the Victims of the USS Maine
- Between 1927 and 1930 extension along the banks of the entrance to the bay
- Until 1930 from La Piragua to the Avenida de los Presidentes (calle G)
- Between 1948 and 1952 to the mouth of the Almendares River

=== Today ===
The Malecón continues to be popular among Cubans.

It also provides a source of food for poorer families who fish there at night. In addition, it is used for prostitution in Cuba with women and men providing sexual services to tourists.

Although the houses lining the Malecón are mostly in ruins, the Malecón remains one of the most spectacular and popular destinations in Havana.

== Points of interest ==
There are a number of important monuments along the Malecón, including those to General Máximo Gomez, Antonio Maceo, General Calixto García, and the Monument to the Victims of the USS Maine.

At the intersection of 23rd Street, the Malecón marks the northeast end of the La Rampa section of 23rd Street, Vedado.

In the Plaza de la Dignidad is a statue of José Martí and in front of the Embassy of the United States, the José Martí Anti-Imperialist Platform.

Significant buildings include the Castillo de la Real Fuerza, the Castillo de San Salvador de la Punta, Malecón 17 (Las Cariátides) and the Hotel Nacional.

There were several buildings, monuments, and geographical features that were a part of Barrio de San Lázaro including the Torreón de San Lázaro, La Casa de Beneficencia, Hospital de San Lázaro, the Espada Cemetery, the Casa de Dementes de San Dionisio, the Quarry of San Lázaro, the Batería de la Reina, the Santa Clara Battery, and Hill of Taganana, among others.

== In popular culture ==
The Malecón has served as an inspiration for several cocktail names, including the "Malecón cocktail" by John Escalante that can be traced back to his 1915 Cuban cocktail guide, Manual Del Cantinero.

== Gallery ==
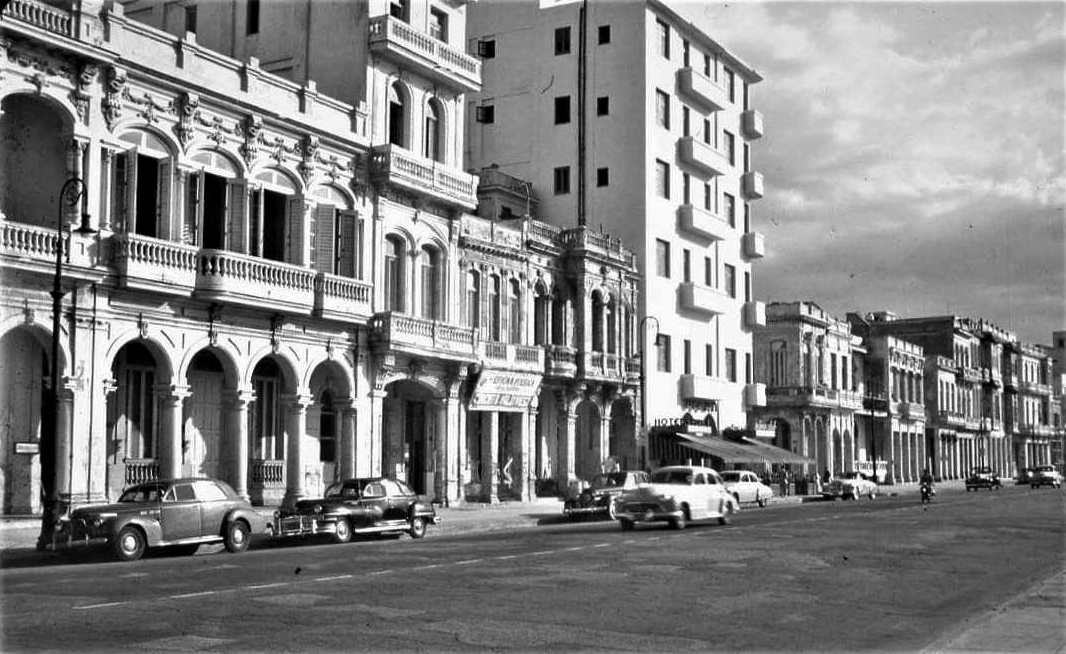
Malecon entre Carcel y Genios, ca, 1955.

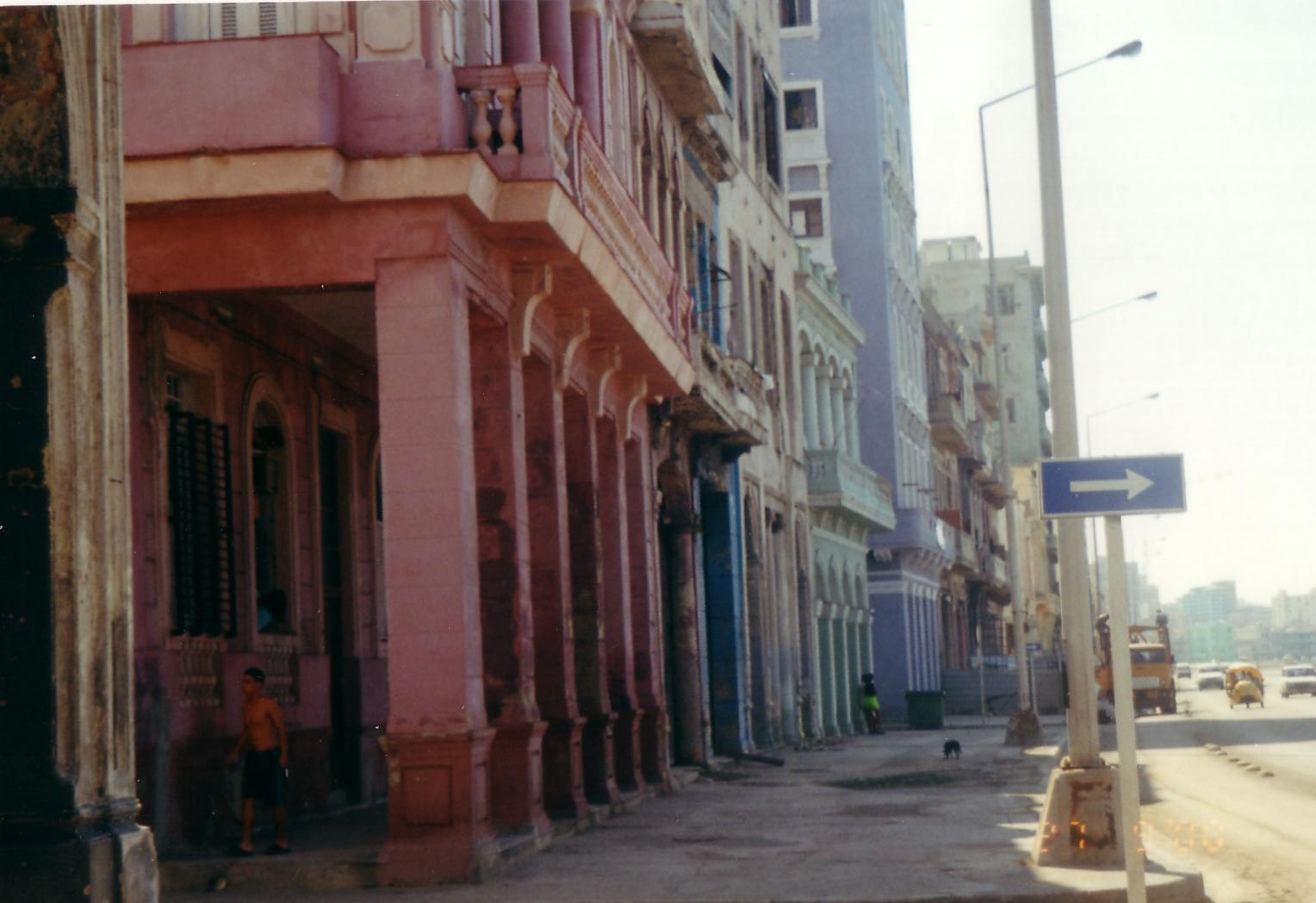
Residences along the Malecón

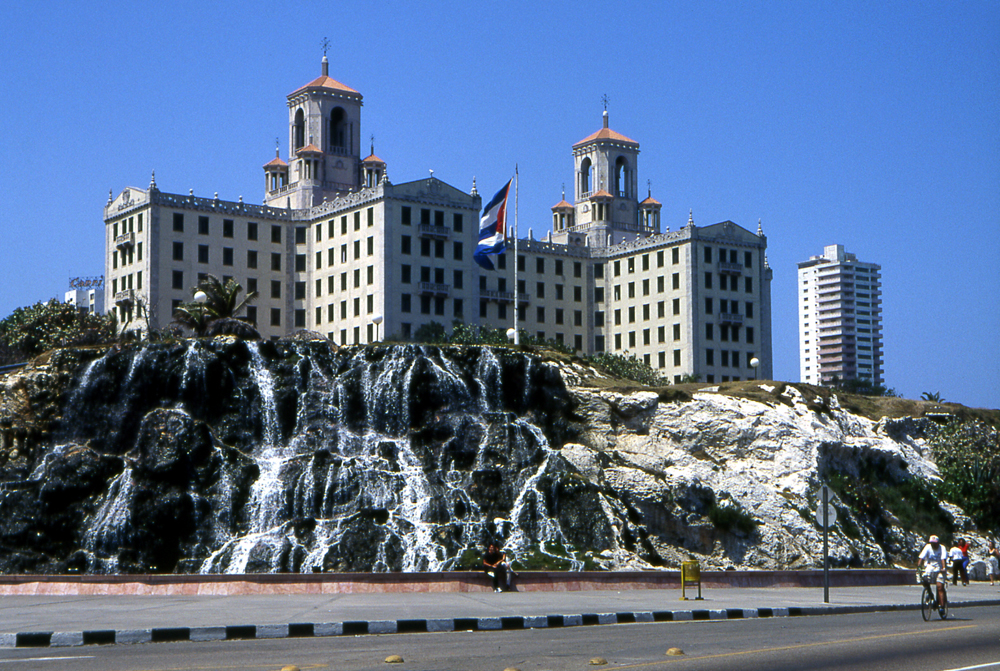
Hotel Nacional de Cuba overlooking the Malecón

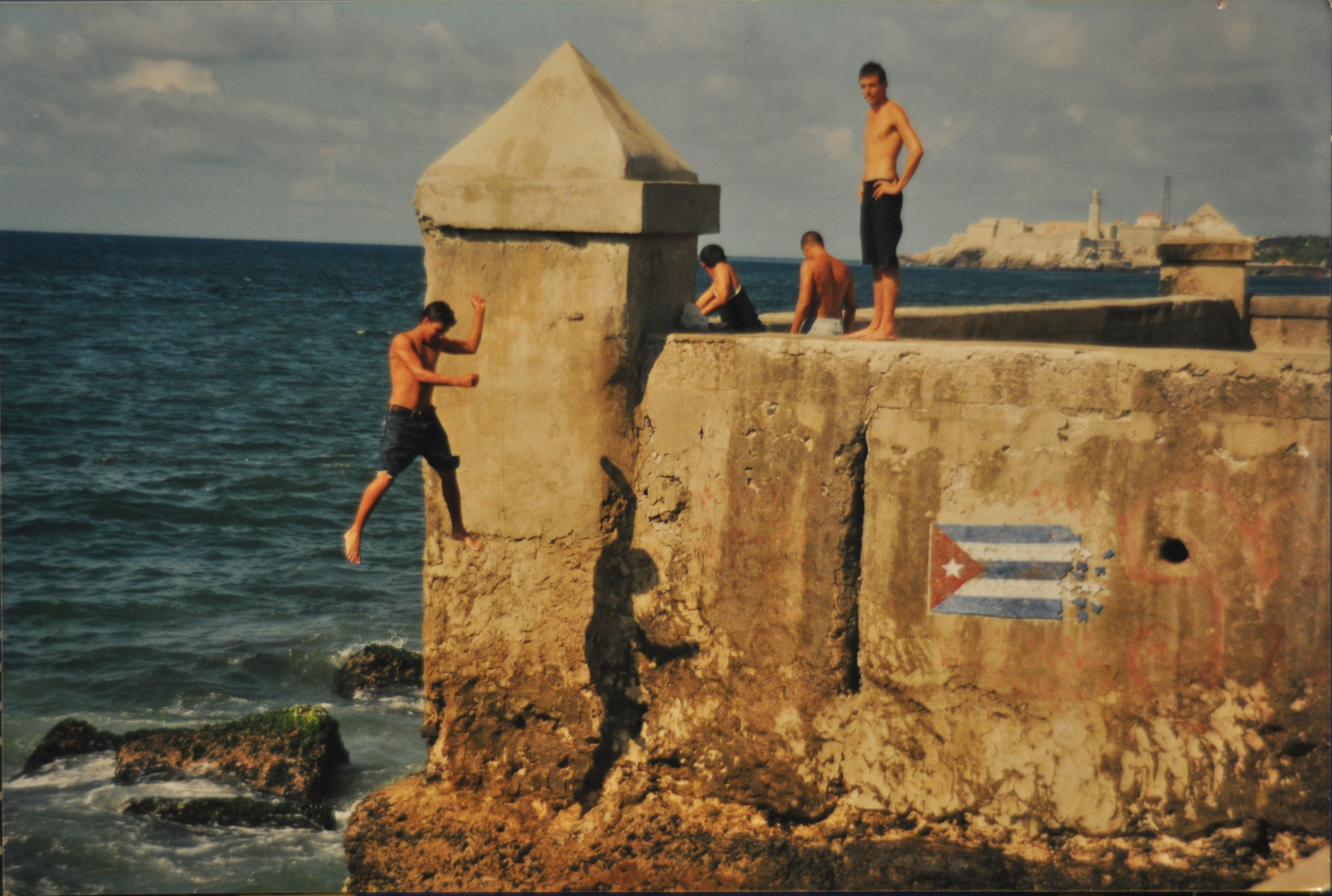
Jumping off the Malecón with the Morro Castle in the background

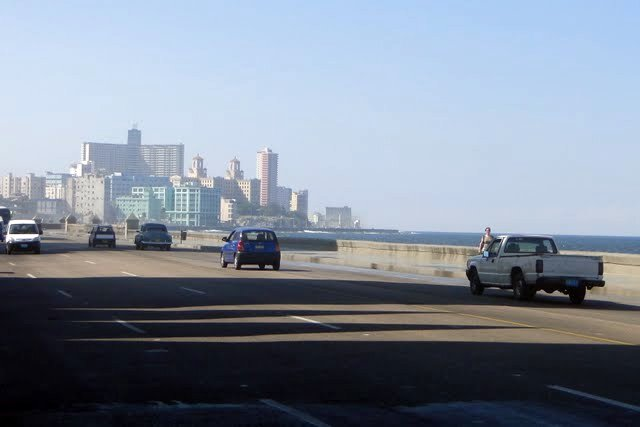
Malecon, Havana

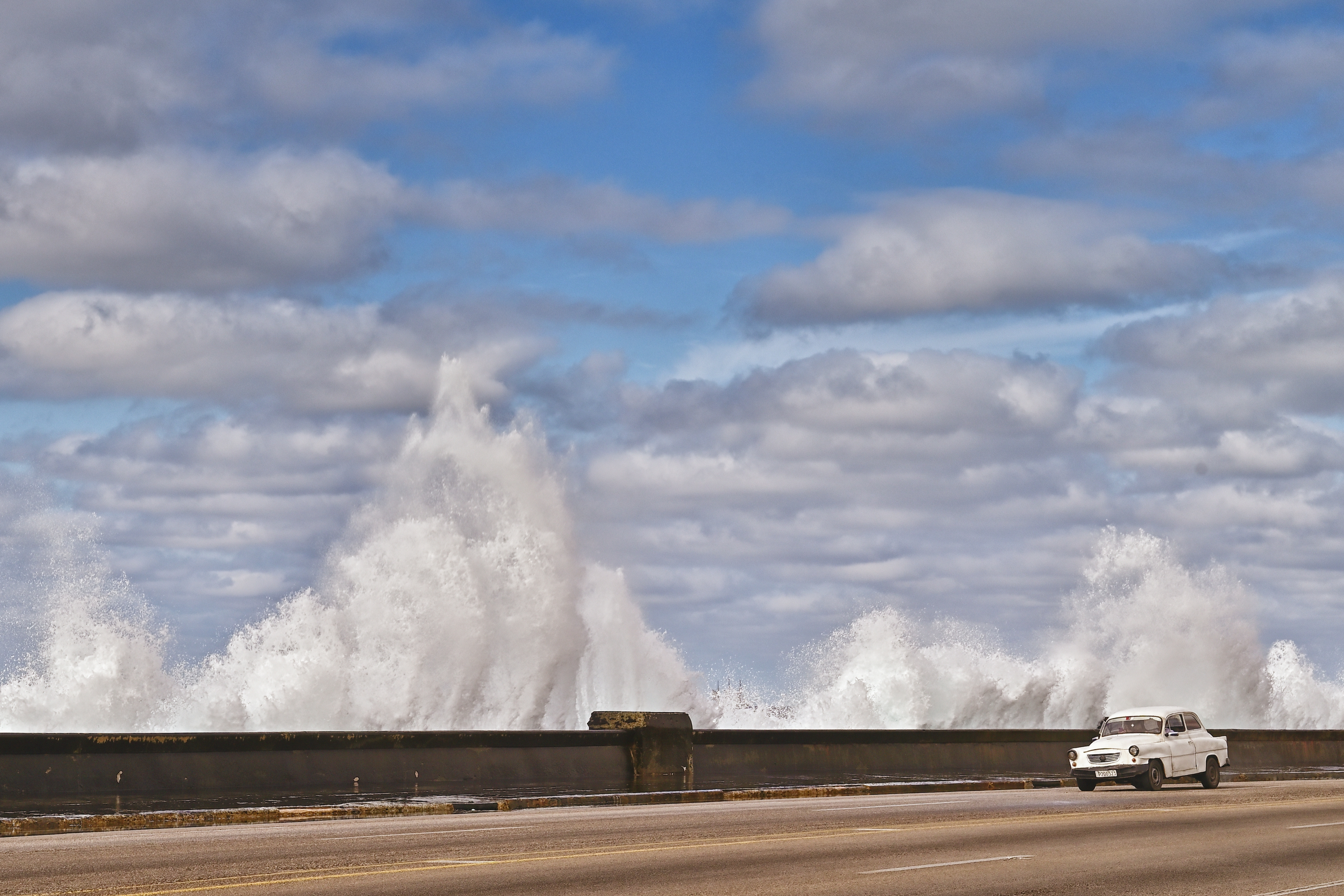
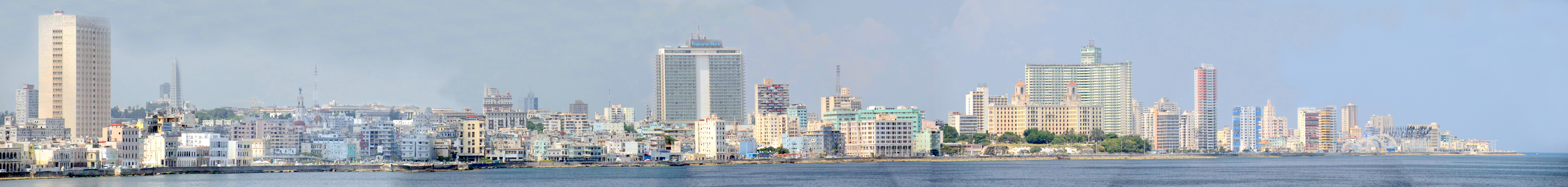
Malecón

== See also ==
- Havana Plan Piloto
- Barrio de San Lázaro, Havana
- La Casa de Beneficencia y Maternidad de La Habana
- Cuban Grand Prix
- Hospital de San Lázaro, Havana
- Monument to the Victims of the USS Maine (Havana)
