= Cuban Grand Prix =

Grand prix

- el Malecon
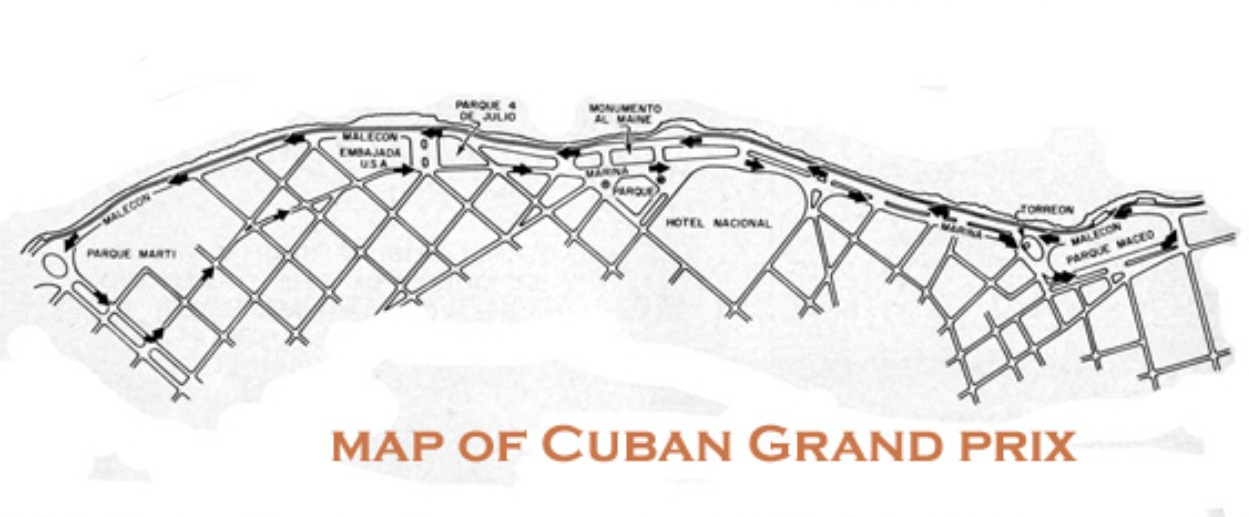

Race information
- Number of times held: 3
- First held: 1957
- Last held: 1960
- Most wins (drivers): (United Kingdom) Stirling Moss (2)
- Most wins (constructors): (Italy) Maserati (2)
- Circuit length: 5.591 km (3.23 miles)
- Race length: 260.50 km (161.50 miles)
- Laps: 50

Last race (1960)

Pole position
- (United Kingdom) Stirling Moss; Maserati

Podium
- 1. (United Kingdom) Stirling Moss; Maserati; 2. (Mexico) Pedro Rodríguez; Ferrari; 3. (United States) Masten Gregory; Porsche

Fastest lap
- (United Kingdom) Stirling Moss; Maserati

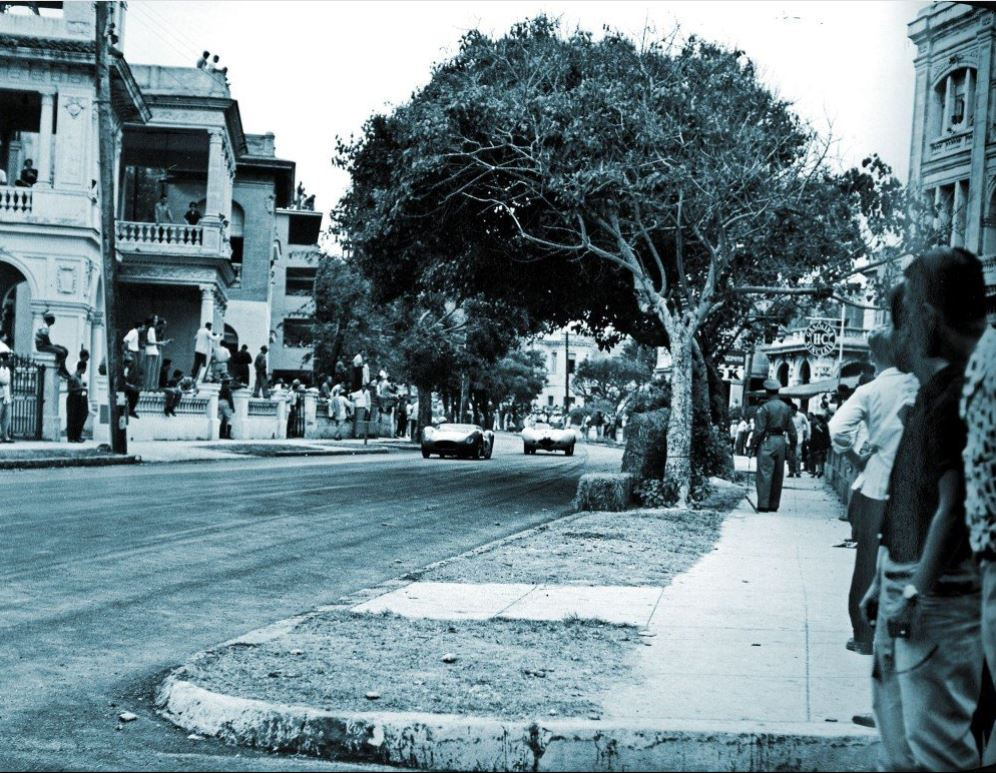
1958 Cuban Grand Prix.

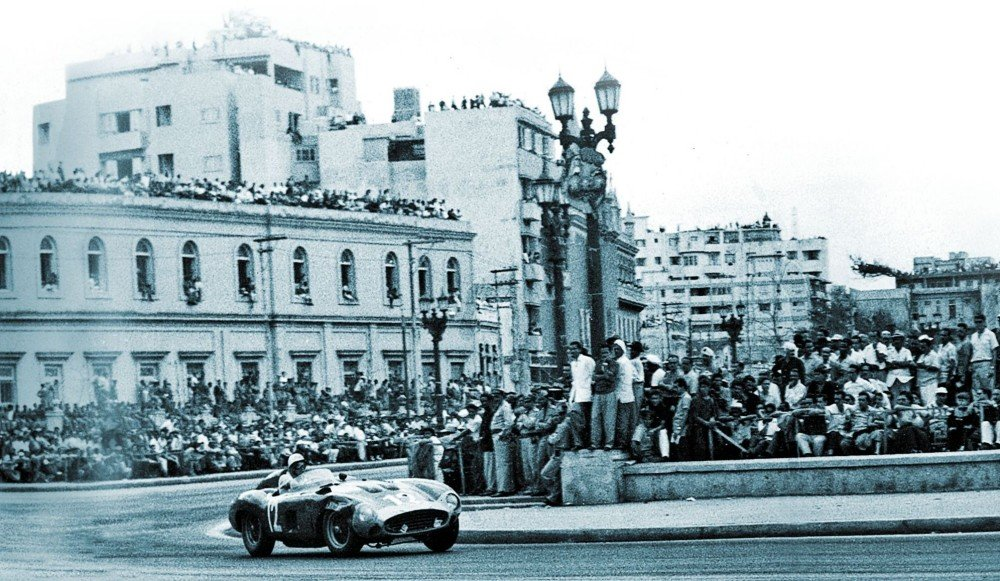
La Casa de Beneficencia y Maternidad de La Habana Cuba Grand Prix. 1957

The Cuban Grand Prix, also known as the Havana Grand Prix, was a sports car motor race held for a brief period in the late 1950s in Havana, Cuba, last raced in 1960. The 1958 race is best remembered as the backdrop to the kidnapping of Formula One World Champion driver Juan Manuel Fangio by anti-government rebels linked to the 26th of July Movement.

== History ==
The race was established in 1957 as Fulgencio Batista envisioned creating an event to attract tourists, particularly from the United States. A street circuit was established on the Malecón. The first race was a success; it was won by Fangio driving a Maserati 300S, leading home Carroll Shelby driving a Ferrari 410 S and Alfonso de Portago in a Ferrari 860 Monza.

The following year the official Maserati team arrived in force with their fleet of Maserati 300S cars and Fangio and Stirling Moss as drivers. On the eve of the race Fangio was abducted from his hotel by an armed man. The Cuban government ordered the race to continue. Moss and Masten Gregory led the race which was red flagged after just six laps. Armando Garcia Cifuentes had crashed his Ferrari into the crowd, killing seven.

The 1959 race was cancelled as Fidel Castro's revolution entered its final stages. The race returned in 1960, at a new venue on service roads around a military airfield. Moss, driving a Maserati Birdcage for privateer team Camoradi, had a comfortable victory over NART run Ferrari 250 TR59 driven by Pedro Rodríguez with Masten Gregory third in a Porsche 718.

== Winners of the Cuban Grand Prix ==
Year	Driver	Constructor	Location	Report
1957	(Argentina) Juan Manuel Fangio	Maserati 300S	Malecon Avenue	Report
1958	(United Kingdom) Stirling Moss	Ferrari 335 S	Malecon Avenue	Report
1959	Not held			
1960	(United Kingdom) Stirling Moss	Maserati Tipo 61	Camp Freedom	Report

== Gallery ==
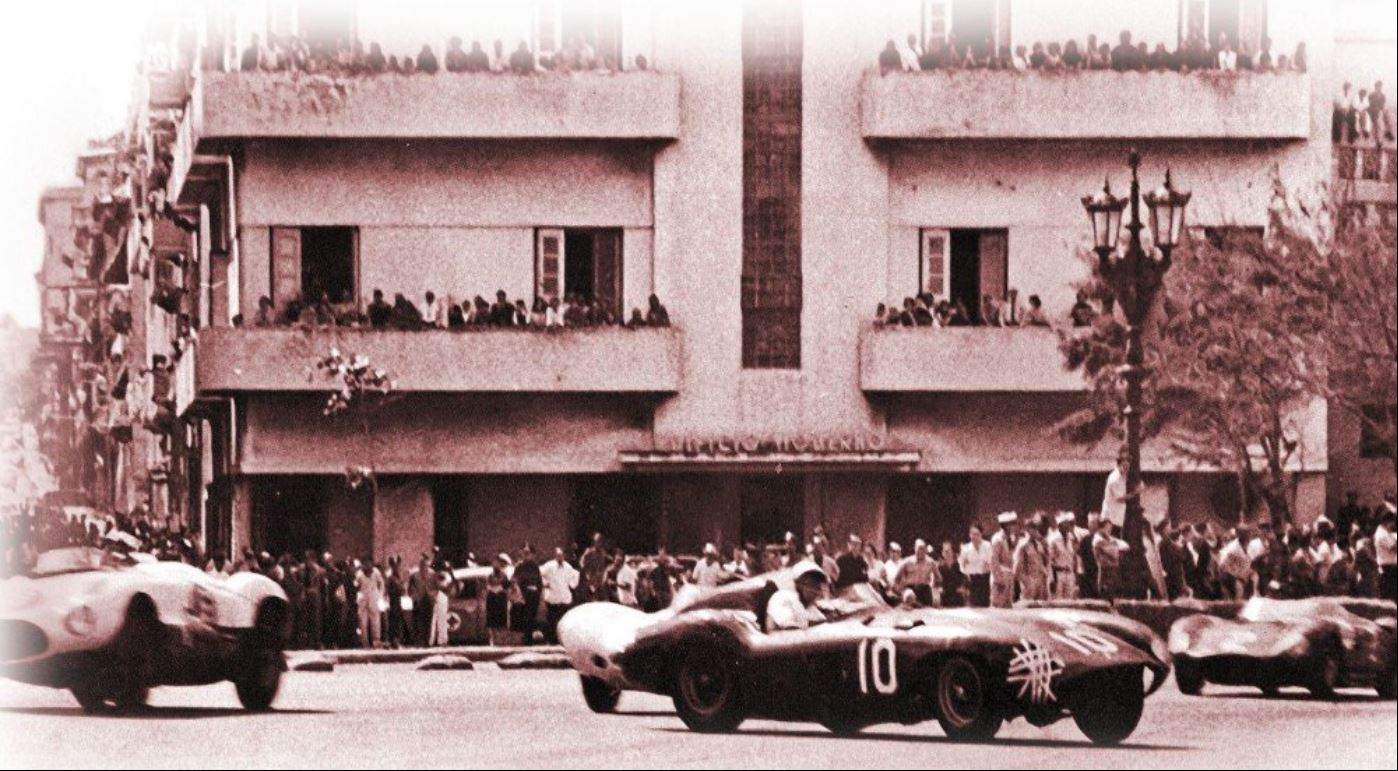
Cuban Grand Prix 1958

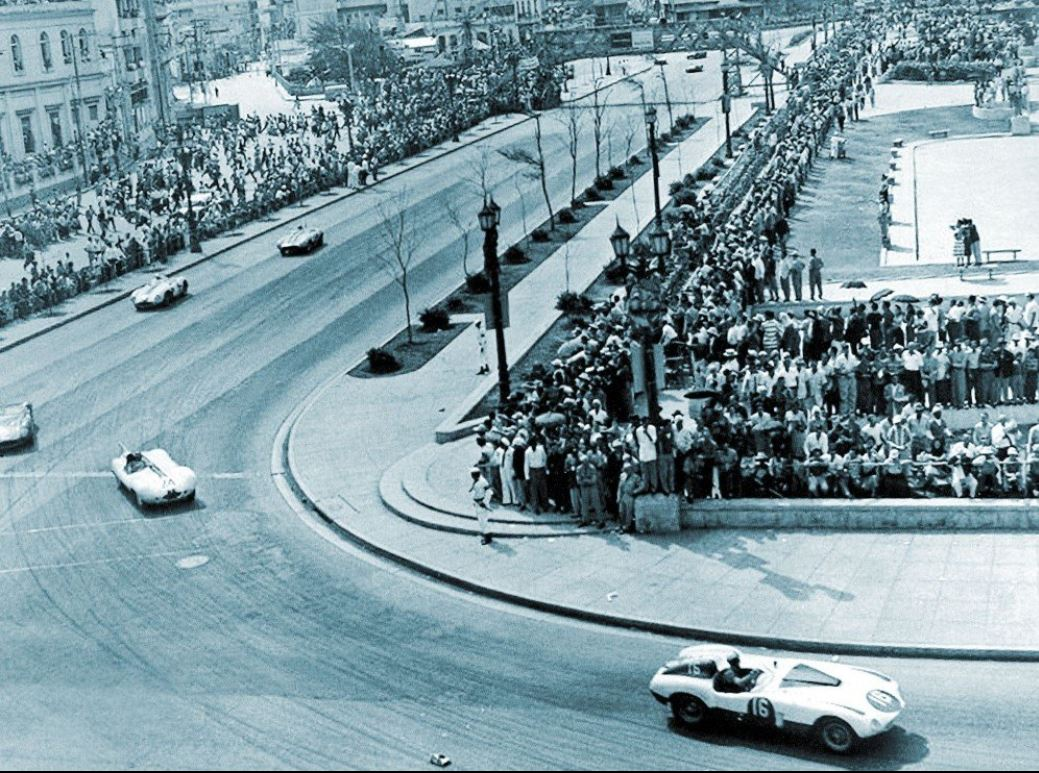
Cuban Grand Prix 1958

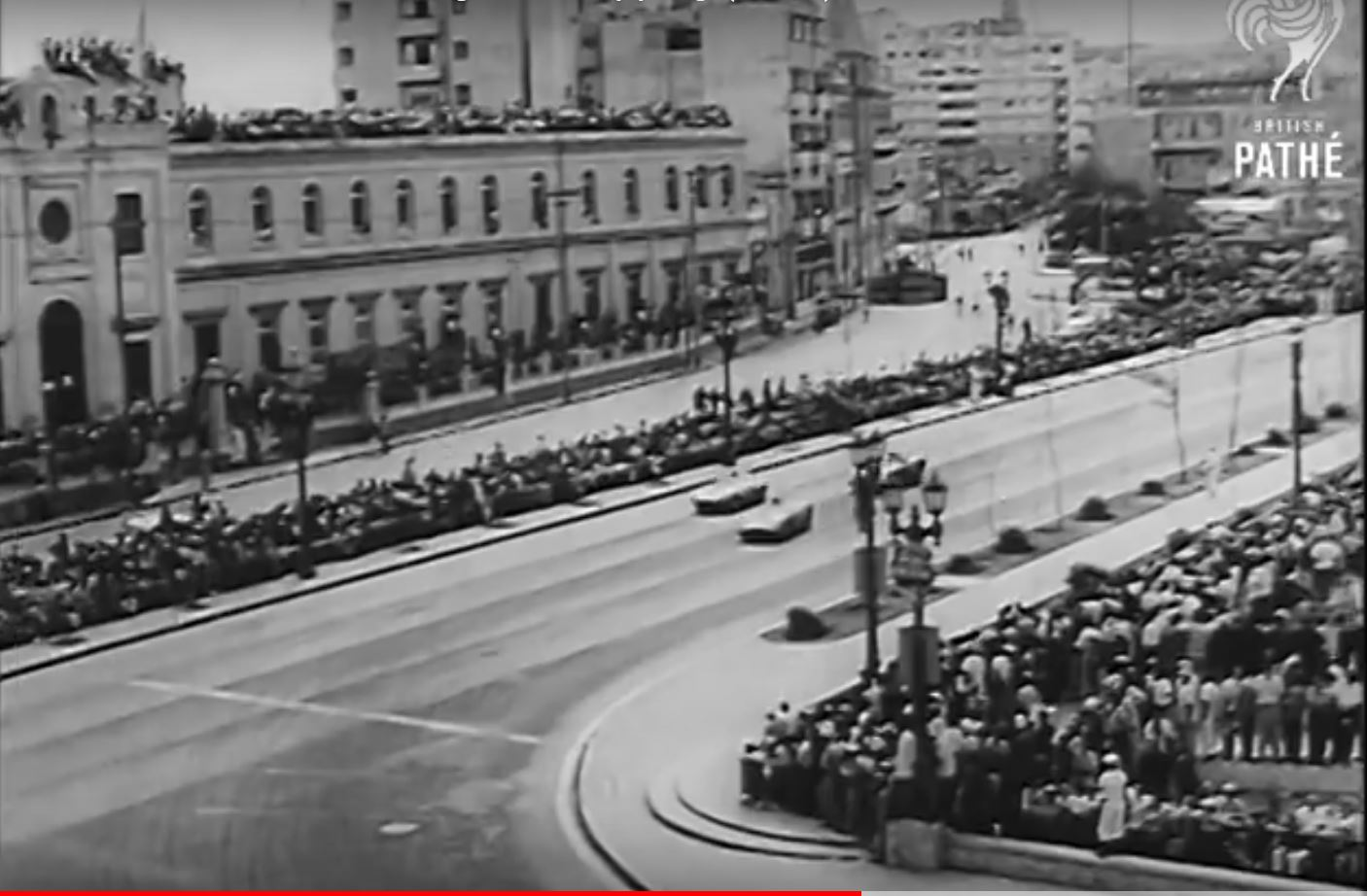
Cuban Grand Prix 1958

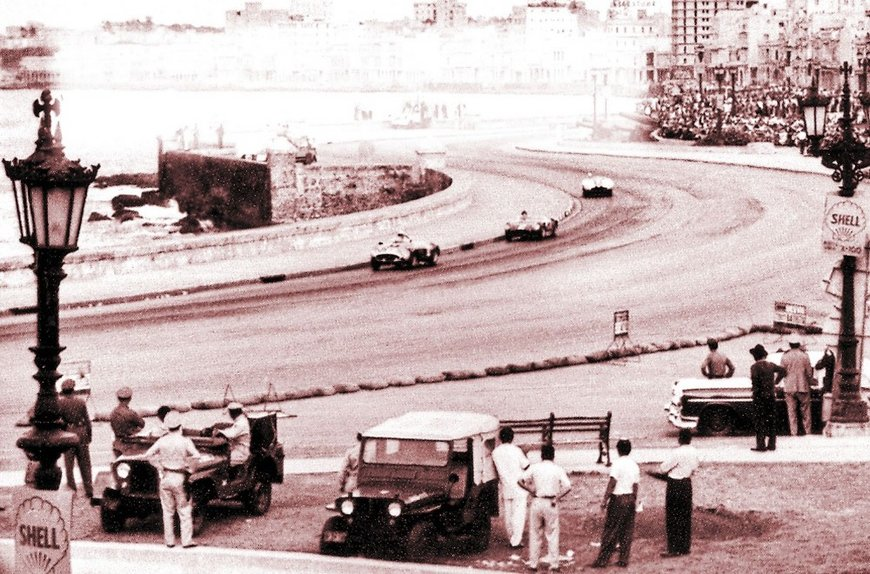
Cuban Grand Prix 1958

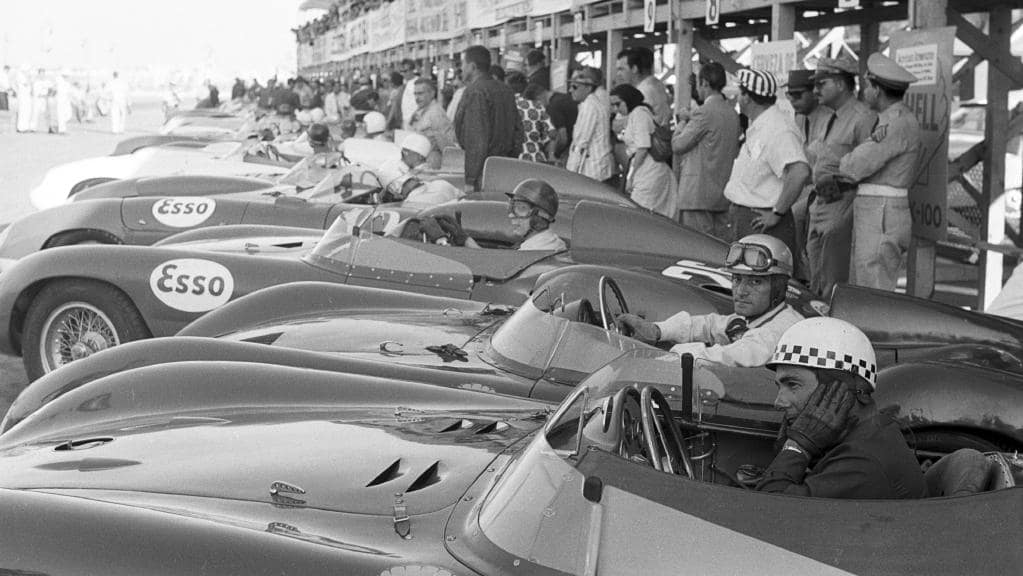
23 February 1958. Cuban Grand Prix. Havana

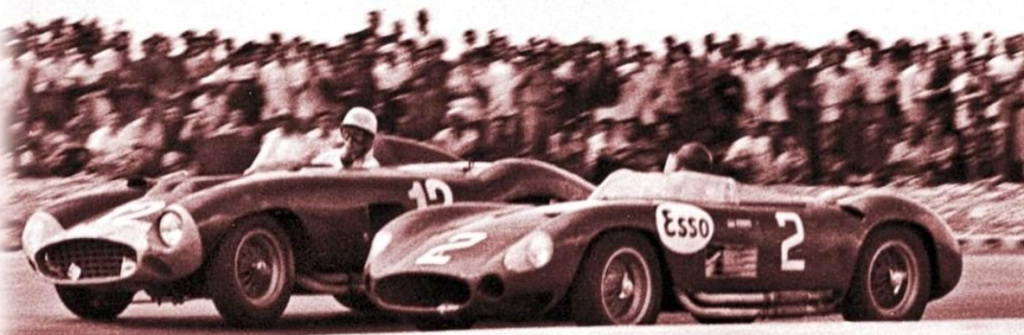
Cuban Grand Prix. Havana, Cuba, 1957

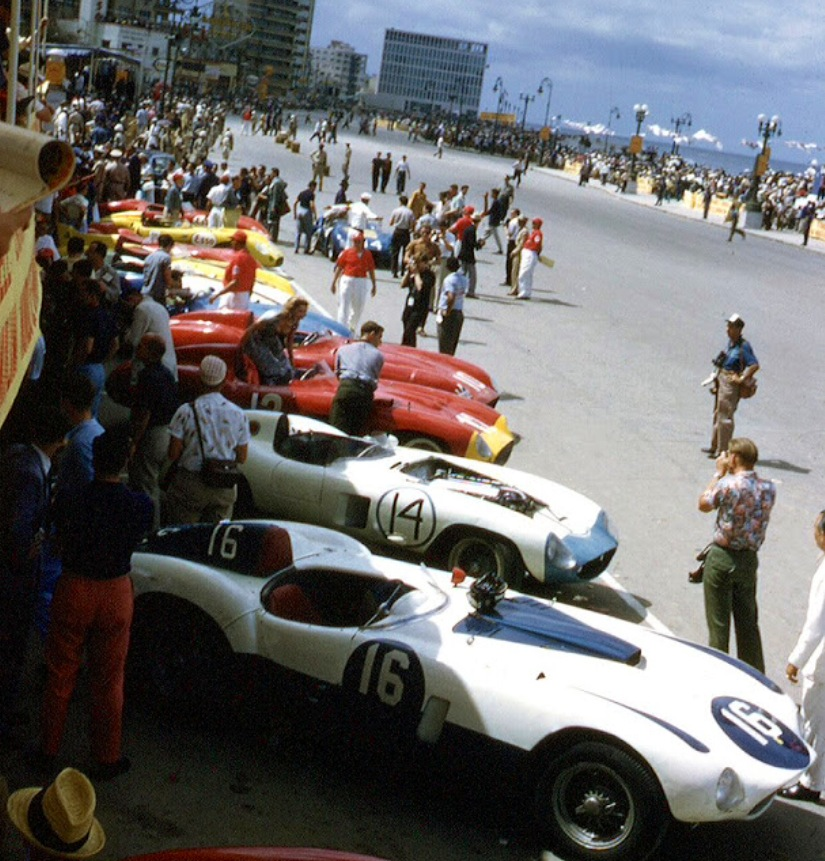
Cuban Grand Prix. Havana, Cuba, 1957

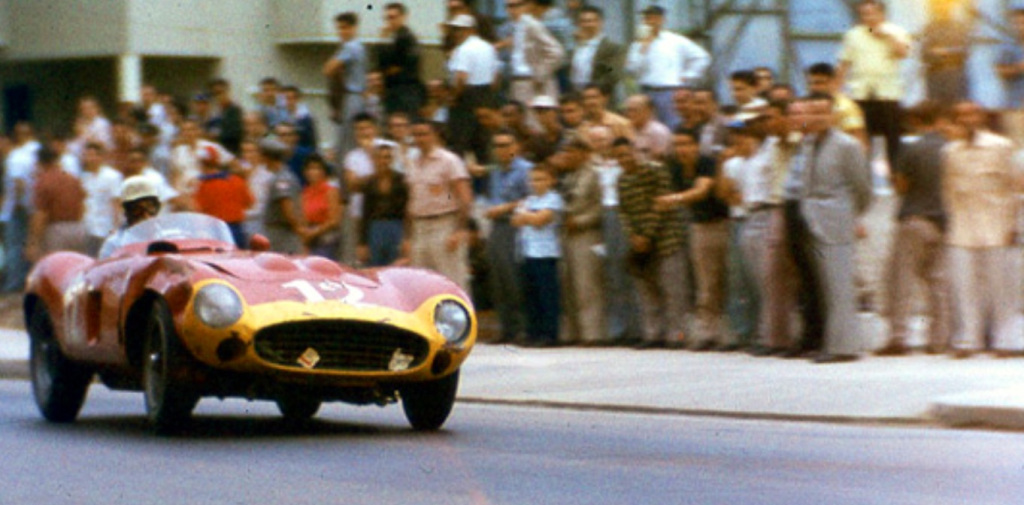
Cuban Grand Prix. Havana, Cuba, 1957

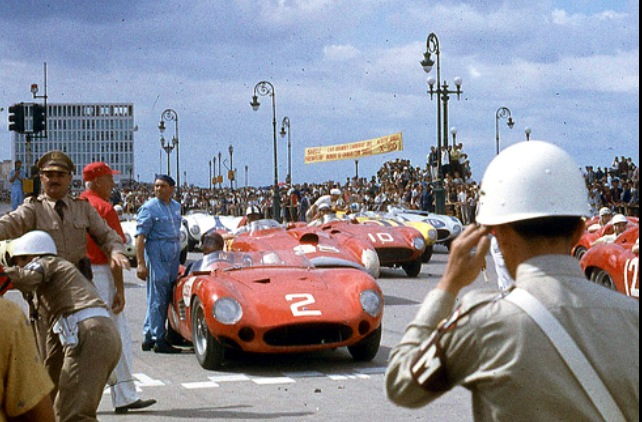
Cuban Grand Prix. Havana, Cuba, 1957

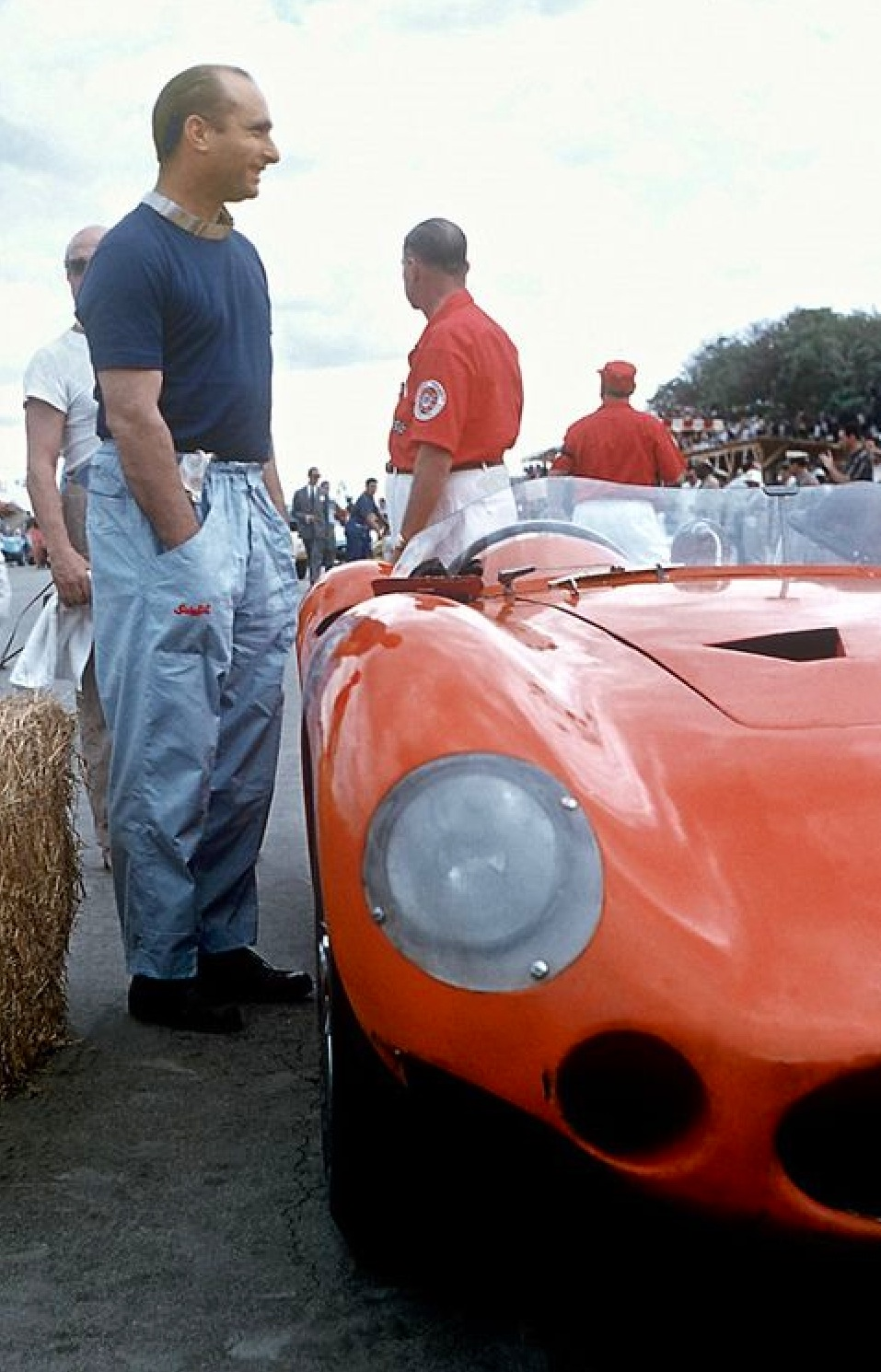
Cuban Grand Prix Juan Manuel Fangio. Havana, Cuba, 1957

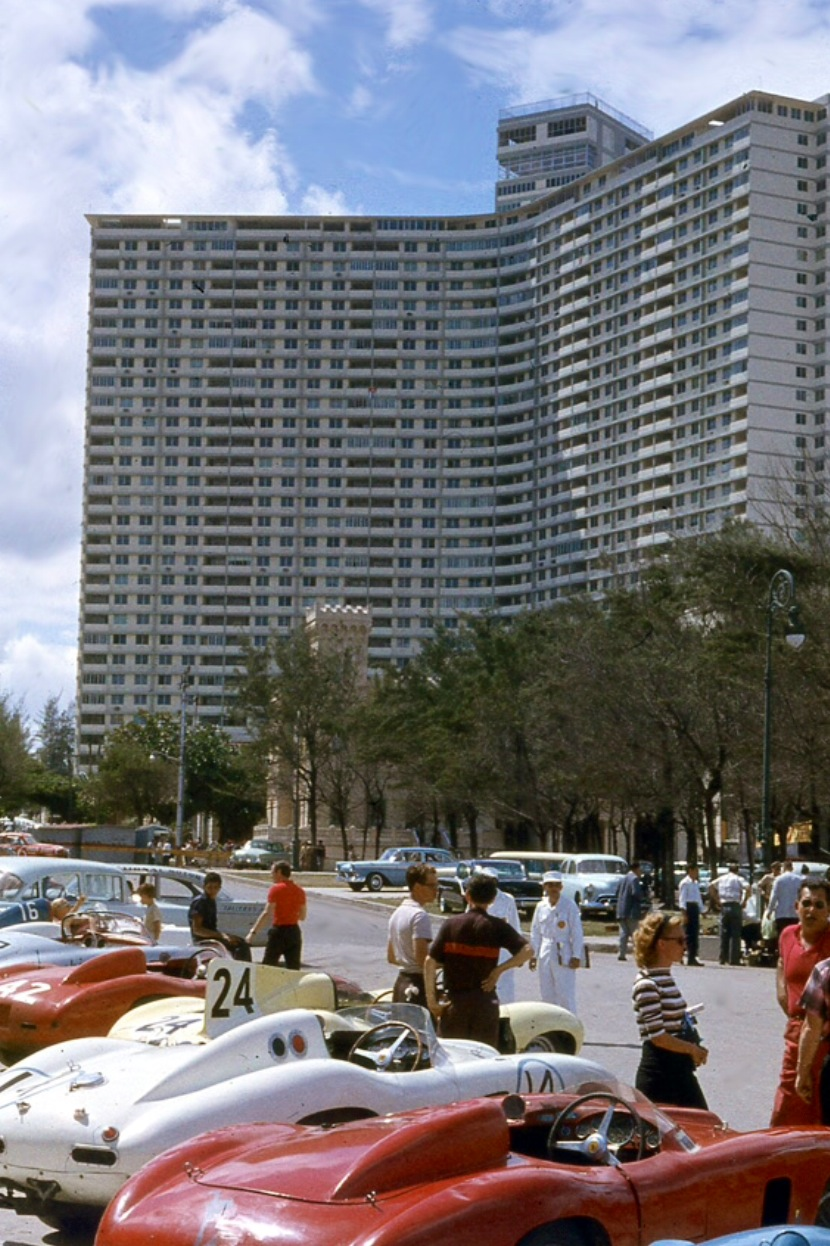
Cuban Grand Prix FOCSA Building. Havana, Cuba, 1957

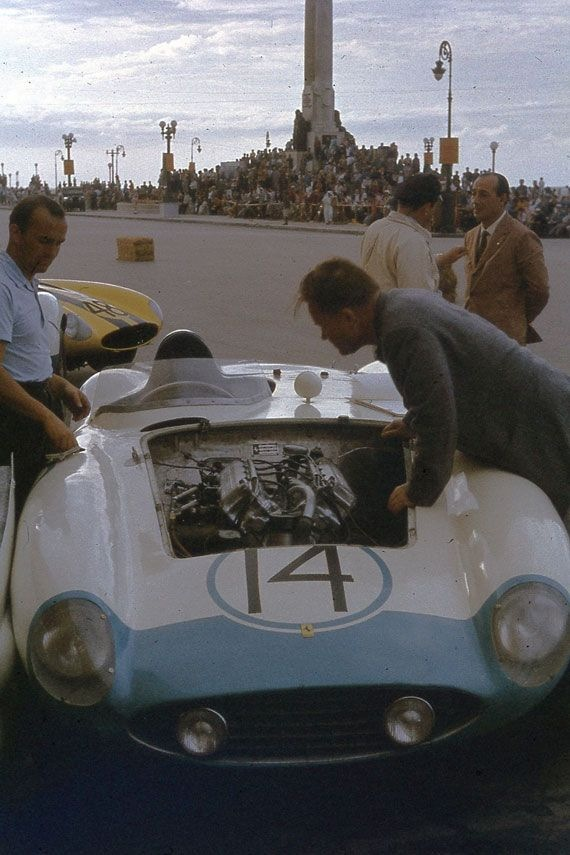
Cuban Grand Prix Hill, O’Shea Ferrari 857 S. Havana, Cuba, 1957

== See also ==
- Barrio de San Lázaro, Havana
- Hospital de San Lázaro, Havana
- Monument to the Victims of the USS Maine (Havana)
- La Casa de Beneficencia y Maternidad de La Habana
