= Monument to the Victims of the USS Maine =

Monument in Havana, Cuba

- Monumento a las víctimas del Maine
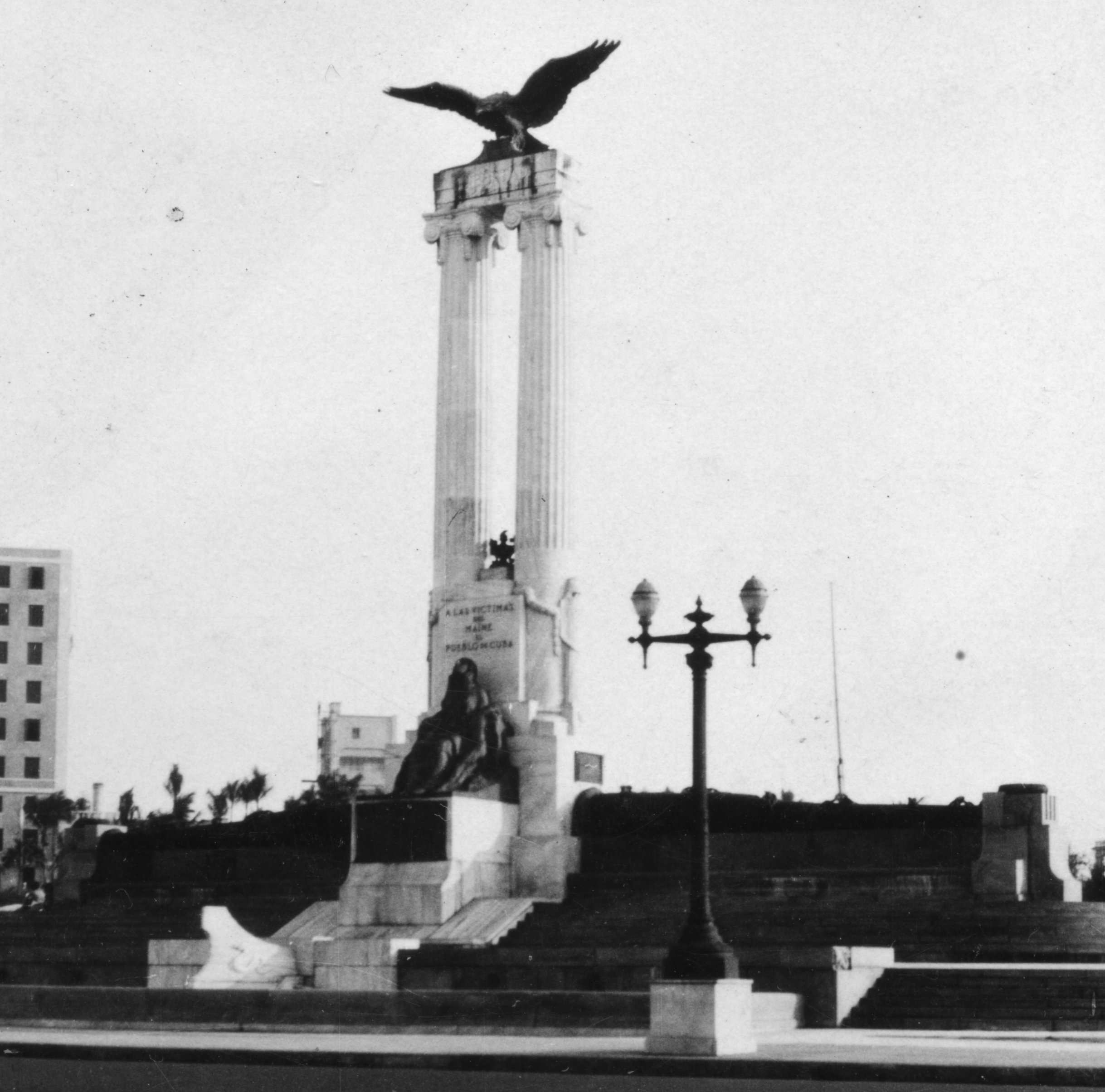

General information
- Architectural style: Classical
- Location: Malecon and Línea, Havana, Cuba
- Coordinates: 23°8′42″N 82°22′54″W
- Construction started: 1924
- Construction stopped: 1925
- Inaugurated: 8 March 1925

Height
- Height: 12 metres

Technical details
- Structural system: Load bearing
- Material: Carrara marble and bronze

Design and construction
- Architect: Félix Cabarrocas

References
- USS Maine

The Monument to the Victims of the USS Maine (Spanish: Monumento a las víctimas del Maine) was built in 1925 on the Malecón boulevard at the end of Línea Calle, in the Vedado neighborhood of Havana, Cuba.

== History ==
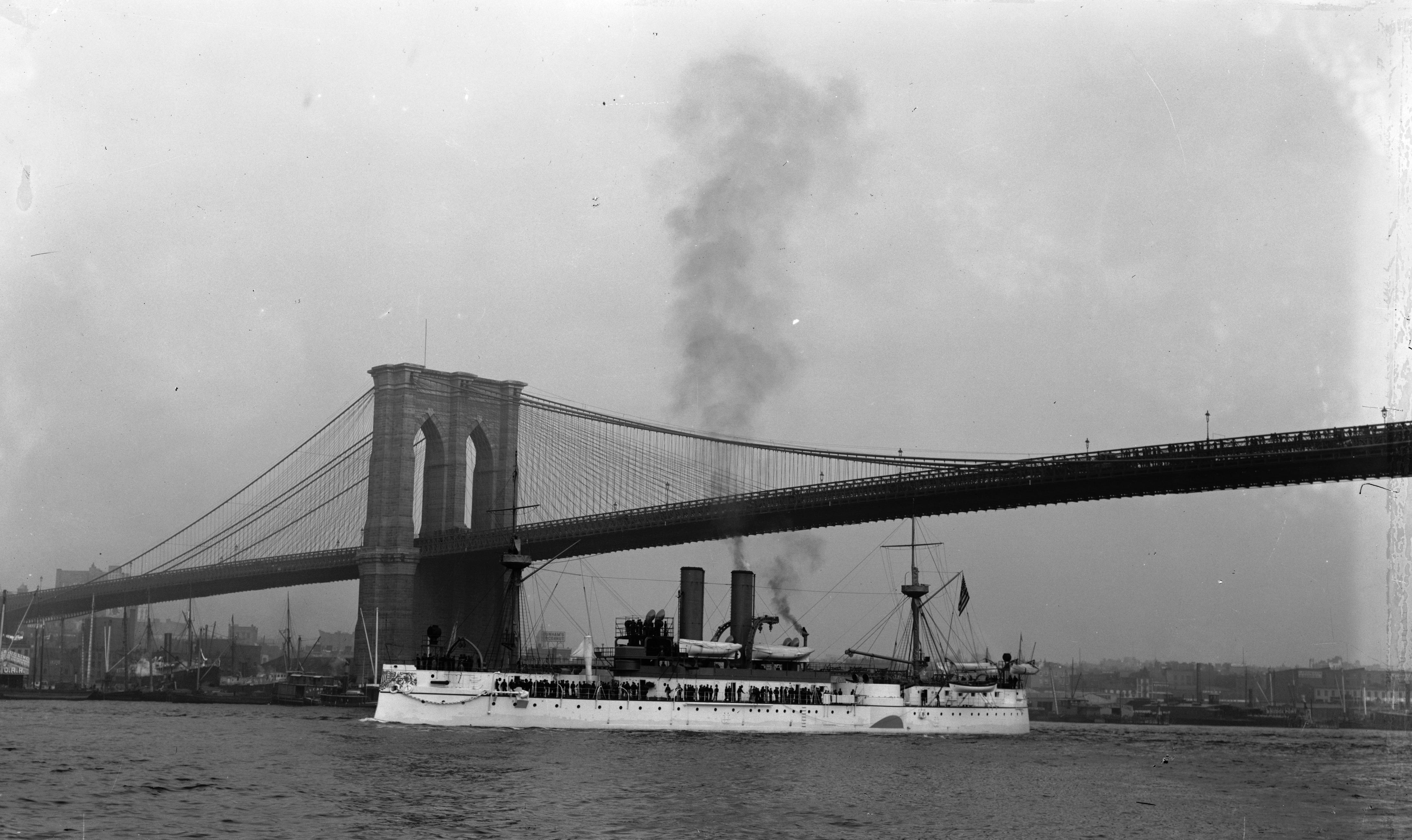
American battleship Maine

The American battleship Maine exploded in Havana harbor on February 15, 1898, killing two officers and 250 sailors. Fourteen of the survivors eventually died of their injuries, bringing the death toll to a total 266. A board of inquiry concluded that the explosion was caused by a mine placed outside the ship, and the release of the board’s report led many to accuse Spain of sabotaging the ship, this helped to build public support for the Spanish–American War. (Note: "The Rickover team analyzed the V shape of the keel. Instead of suggesting an external mine, it indicated that the source of the explosion was solely within the ship." RICKOVER, HOW THE BATTLESHIP MAINE WAS DESTROYED, at 114-115.) Later studies published in 1976, reissued in 1995, concluded that the ship was destroyed from the inside. (Note: "Many ships, including the Maine, had coal bunkers located next to magazines that stored ammunition, gun shells, and gunpowder. Only a bulkhead separated the bunkers from the magazines. If the coal, by spontaneous combustion, overheated, the magazines were at risk of exploding. An investigative board on January 27, 1898, warned the Secretary of the Navy about spontaneous coal fires that could detonate nearby magazines." Allen, Remember the Maine?, at 108.)

Built in honor of the American sailors who died in the explosion of USS Maine which contributed to the United States’ declaration of war on Spain. The ship had anchored in Havana harbor for three weeks previously at the request of American Consul Fitzhugh Lee.

== Monument ==
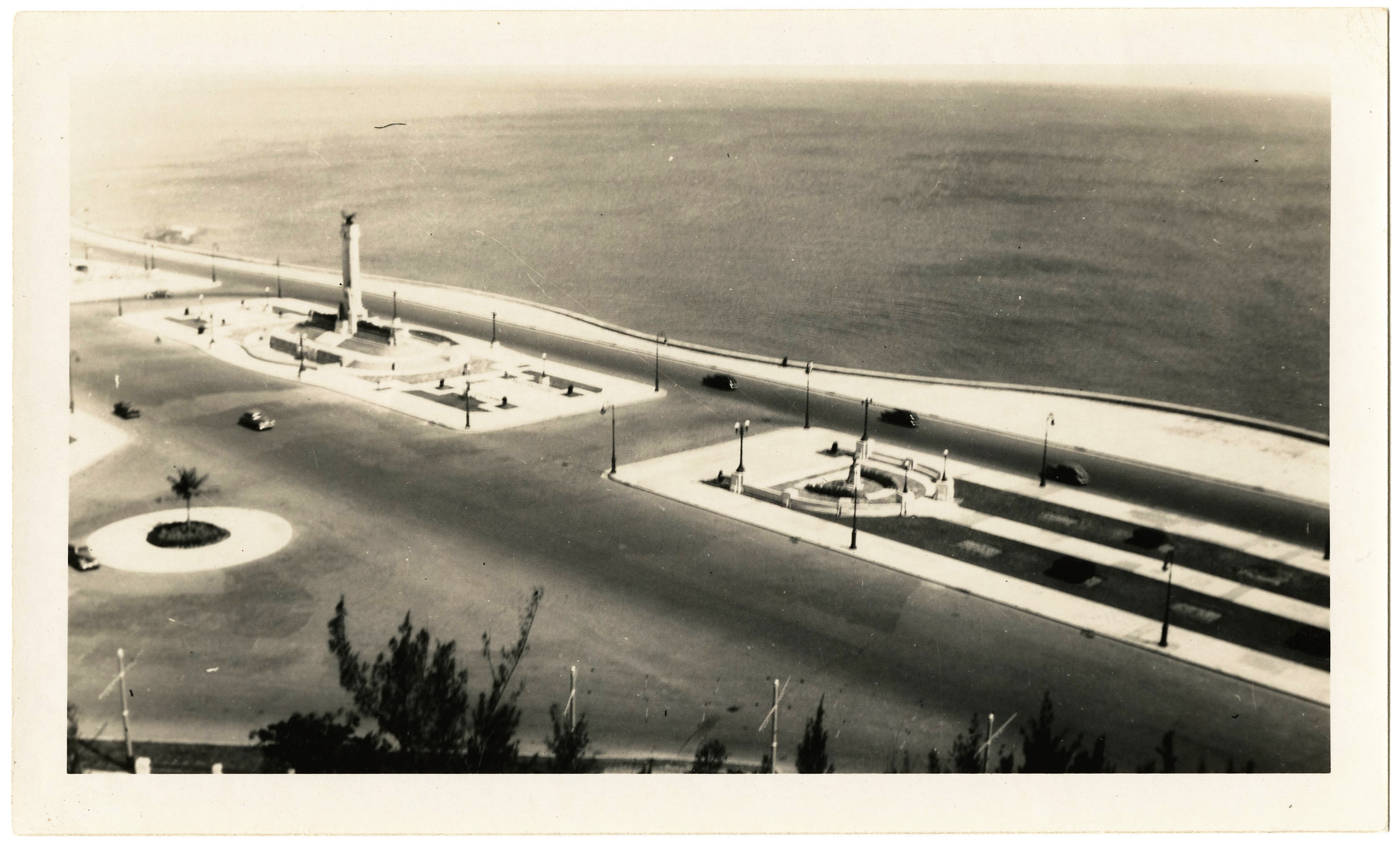
Battleship Maine Monument in Havana Cuba

Fifteen years after the explosion of the USS Maine in 1913, President of the Cuban Republic Mario García Menocal erected a monument on the Malecón in honor of the victims. The architect Félix Cabarrocas oversaw the construction which began in 1924 and ended in 1925 under the tenure of President Alfredo Zayas. On the day of its inauguration, 8 March 1925, Cuban and American personalities attended the celebration including President Zayas and American General John Pershing. At the base of the monument were placed two cannons and a remaining part of the ship's anchor chain that had been salvaged in 1911. In addition, two 40-foot tall Ionic columns were erected; originally the columns did not hold an eagle. Subsequently, they were crowned with a bronze eagle with open wings, created by Cabarrocas. A bronze plaque reads:"To the Victims of the USS Maine. The people of Cuba".

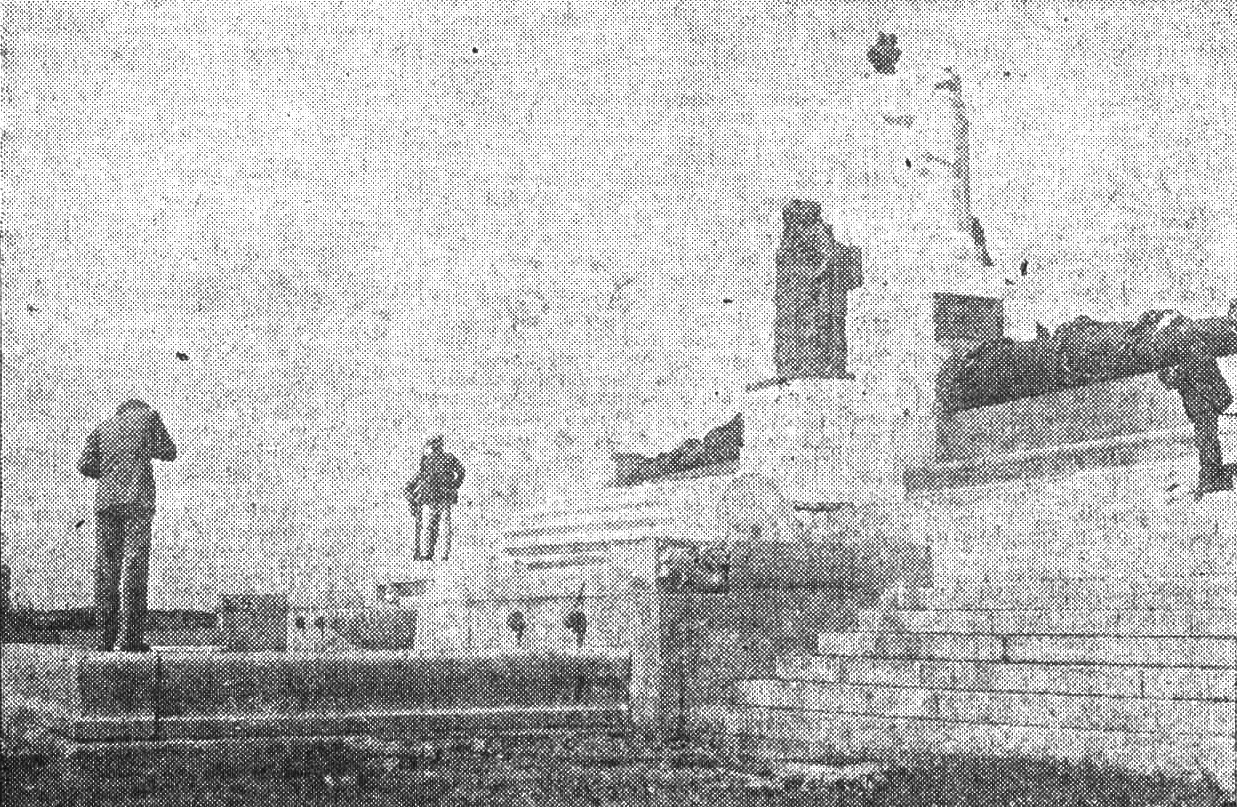
The monument after the 1926 hurricane

The eagle with its wings extended vertically in such a way that a hurricane in October 1926 damaged the monument. The original eagle was replaced in 1926 by one with horizontal wings. The first one is now in the U.S. Embassy in Havana.

== President busts ==
There were originally three busts of Americans: President William McKinley, who declared war on Spain; Leonard Wood, first military governor in Cuba, and President Theodore Roosevelt. On July 4, 1943, a fourth bust was added—that of Andrew Summers Rowan, the army officer who was said to have carried a message to General Calixto Garcia just prior to the start of the Spanish-American War.

== Partial destruction ==
On January 18, 1961, the eagle and busts of the Americans were removed, because it was considered a "symbol of imperialism". The following inscription was later added by the Communist government:

To the victims of the Maine who were sacrificed by the imperialist voracity and their desire to gain control of the island of Cuba
February 1898 – February 1961

(A las víctimas de El Maine que fueron sacrificadas por la voracidad imperialista en su afán de apoderarse de la isla de Cuba.
Febrero 1898 – Febrero 1961)

"The eagle was torn down after the triumph of the revolution because it's the symbol of imperialism, the United States, and the revolution ended all that," said Ernesto Moreno, a 77-year-old Havana resident who remembers waking up one day and seeing the statue gone. "I found it to be a very good thing, and I think most Cubans agreed at the time." Allegedly, Pablo Picasso promised to send a bronze dove to replace the eagle (an episode mentioned in Memories of Underdevelopment), but this did not come to pass.

== Monument restoration ==
The eagle's head was later given to Swiss diplomats. It, too, is now in the building of the Embassy of the United States, Havana. The body and the wings are stored in the Havana City History Museum. The museum's curator believes that good relations with the U.S. will be symbolized by the reunification of the parts of the eagle. Parts of the monument including the original eagle are today being restored.

== Gallery ==
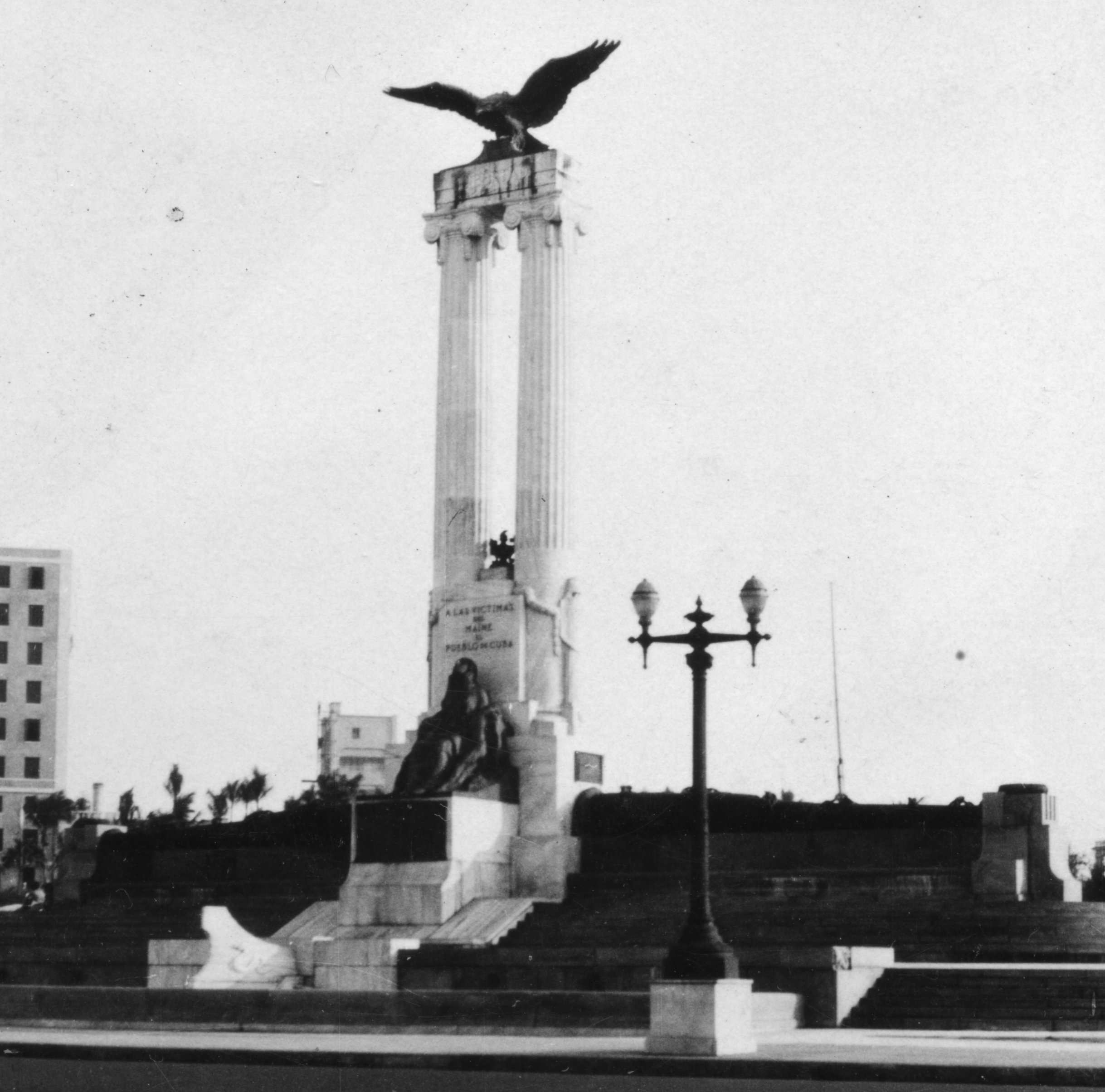
The monument shortly after completion

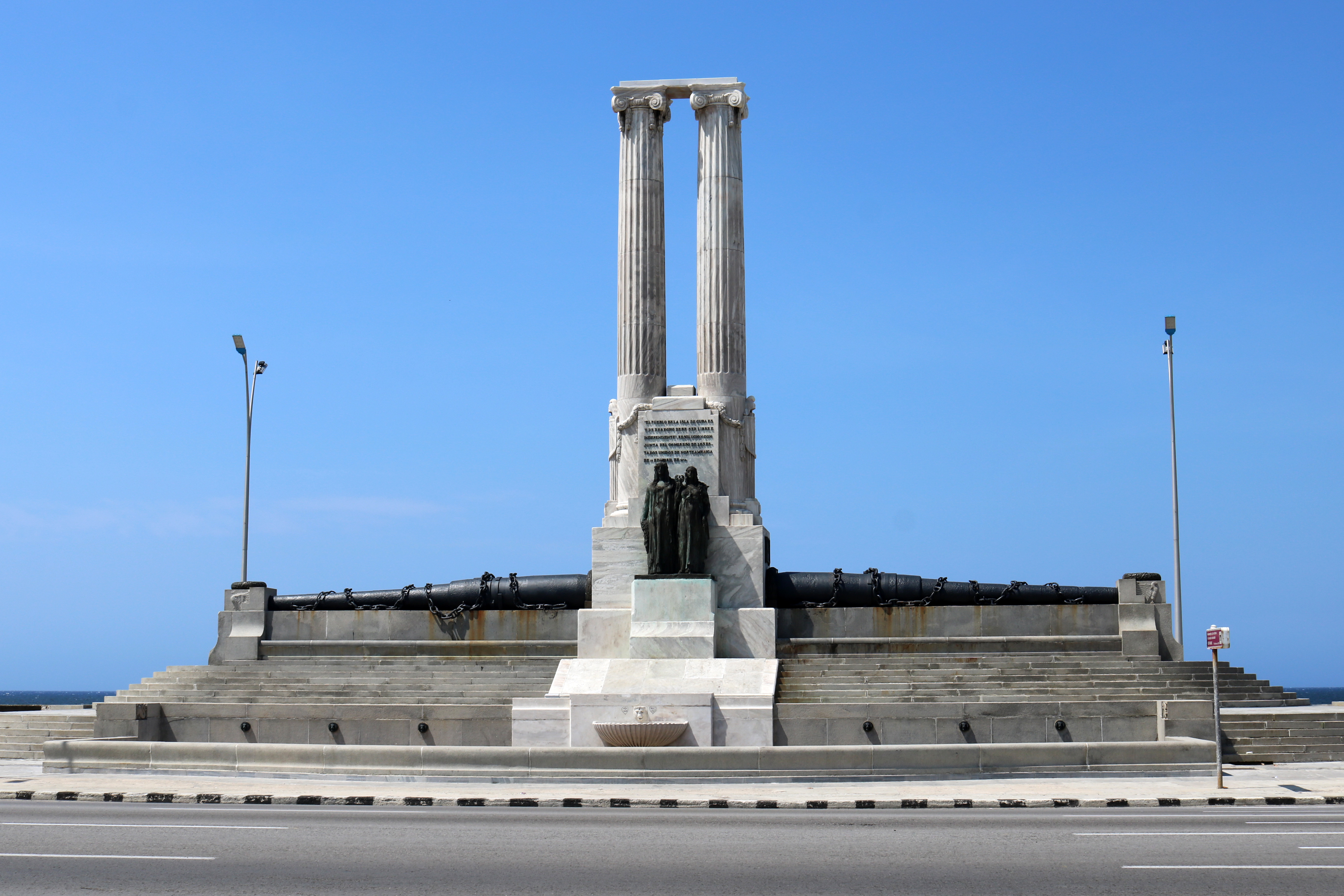
The monument in 2017, front view

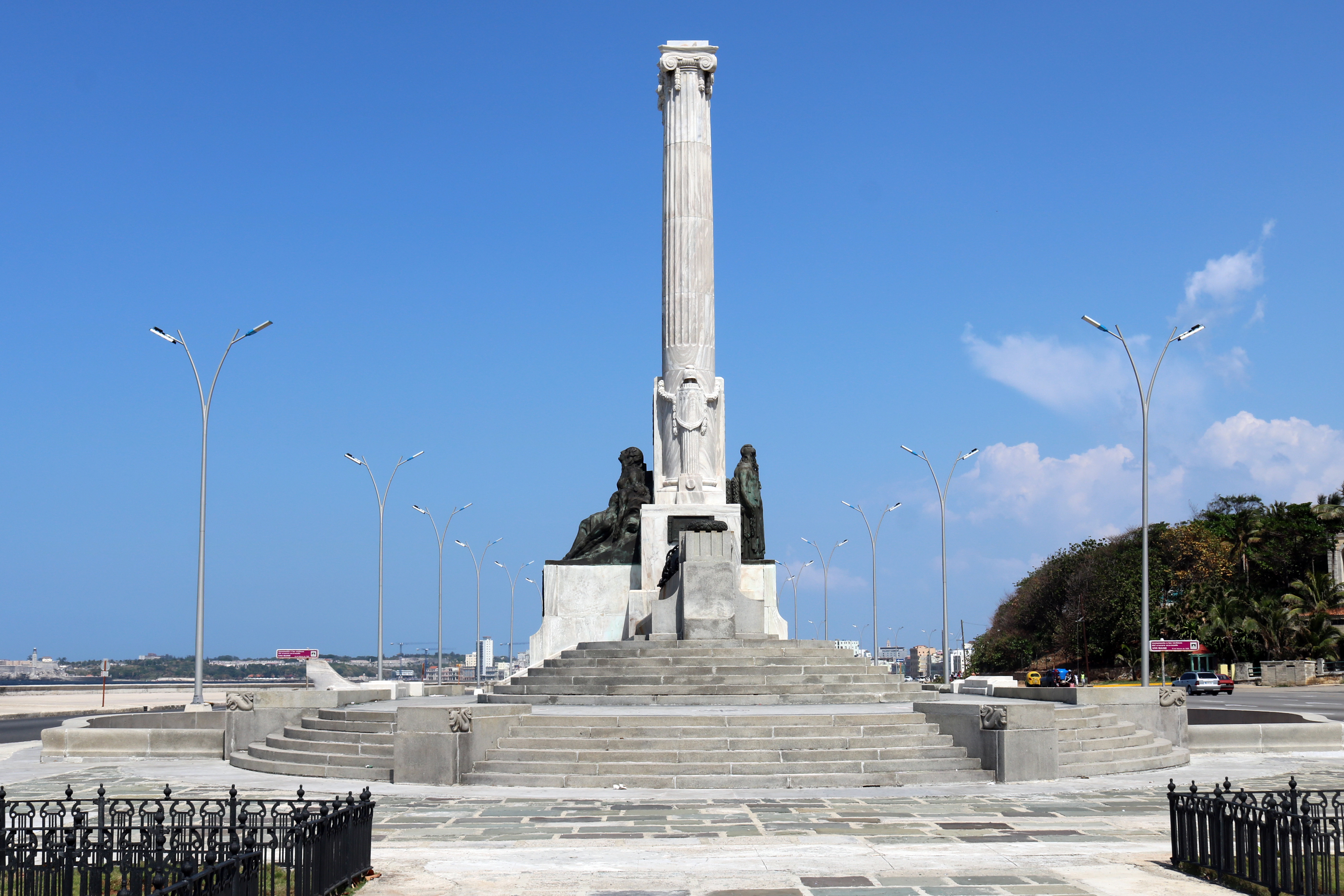
The monument in 2017, side view

The monument as seen from Hotel Nacional de Cuba, 2023

== Other USS Maine monuments ==
Other monuments to USS Maine are located in the U.S. including: Central Park in New York City; Wood-Ridge, NJ; Key West; Arlington National Cemetery; and Annapolis. (See USS Maine: Memorials)

== See also ==
- Spanish–American War
- USS Maine (1889)
- Barrio de San Lázaro, Havana
- Hotel Nacional de Cuba
- FOCSA Building
- Cuban Grand Prix
- Malecón, Havana
