= Hotel Nacional de Cuba =

Spanish eclectic hotel in Havana, Cuba

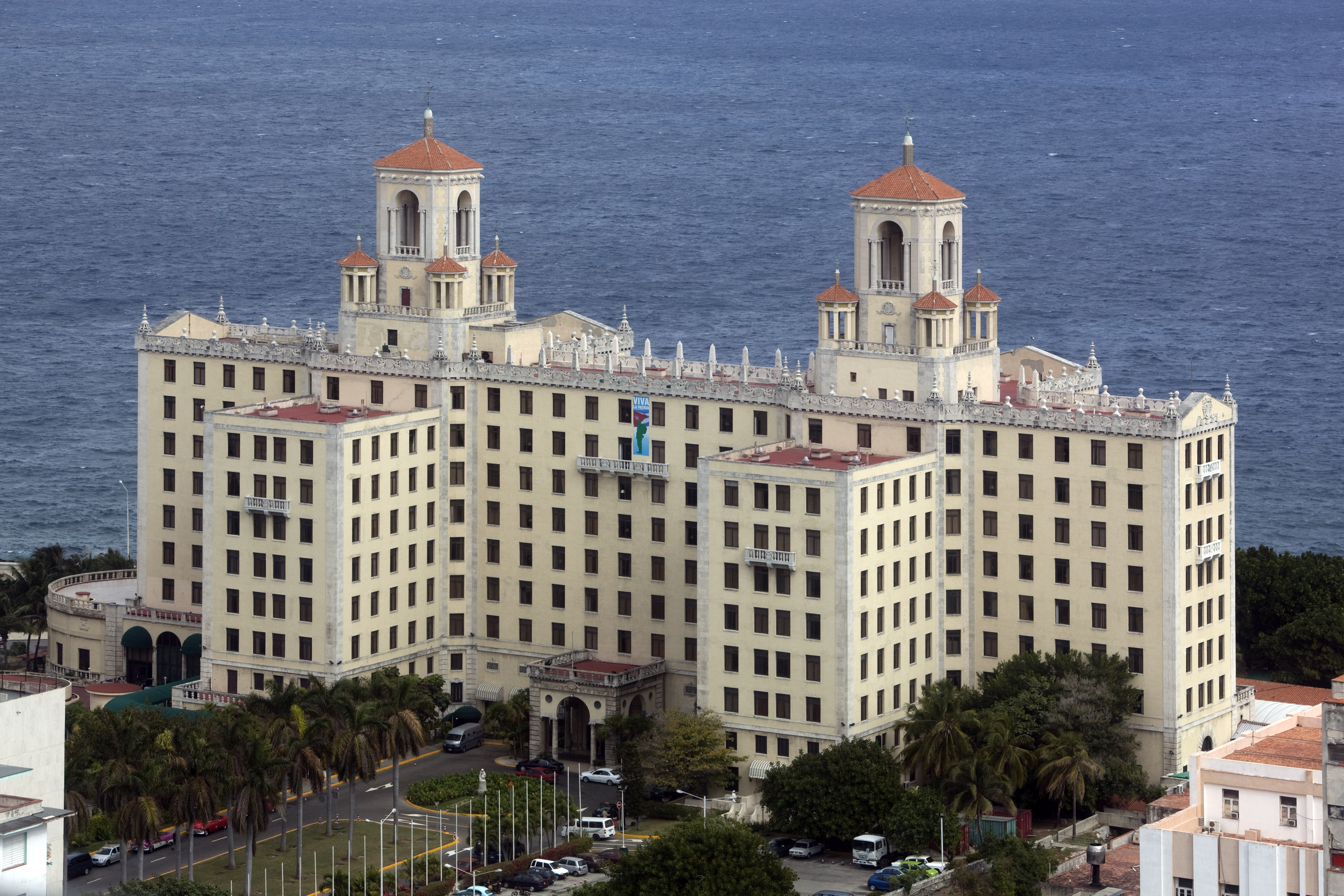
- Hotel Nacional de Cuba
- Interactive map of the Hotel Nacional de Cuba area

General information
- Location: Calle 21 y O Havana, Cuba
- Coordinates: 23°8′35″N 82°22′50″W
- Opening: December 30, 1930

Technical details
- Floor count: 8
- Floor area: 46,530 m^{2} (500,800 sq ft)

Design and construction
- Architect: McKim, Mead and White
- Developer: Purdy and Henderson, Engineers

Other information
- Number of rooms: 457
- Number of suites: 16

Website
- www.hotelnacionaldecuba.com

The Hotel Nacional de Cuba is a historic Spanish eclectic style hotel in Havana, Cuba, opened in 1930. Located on the sea front of Vedado district, it stands on Taganana Hill, offering commanding views of the sea and the city.

== History ==
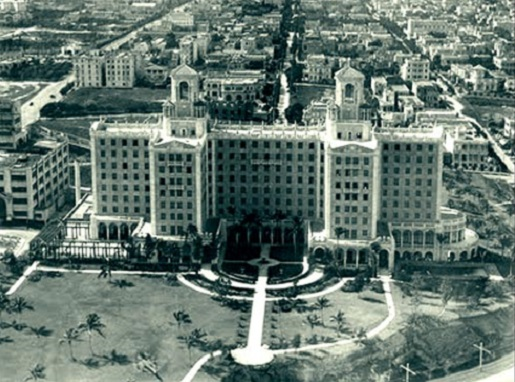
The National Hotel of Cuba, circa 1933.

=== Design and construction ===
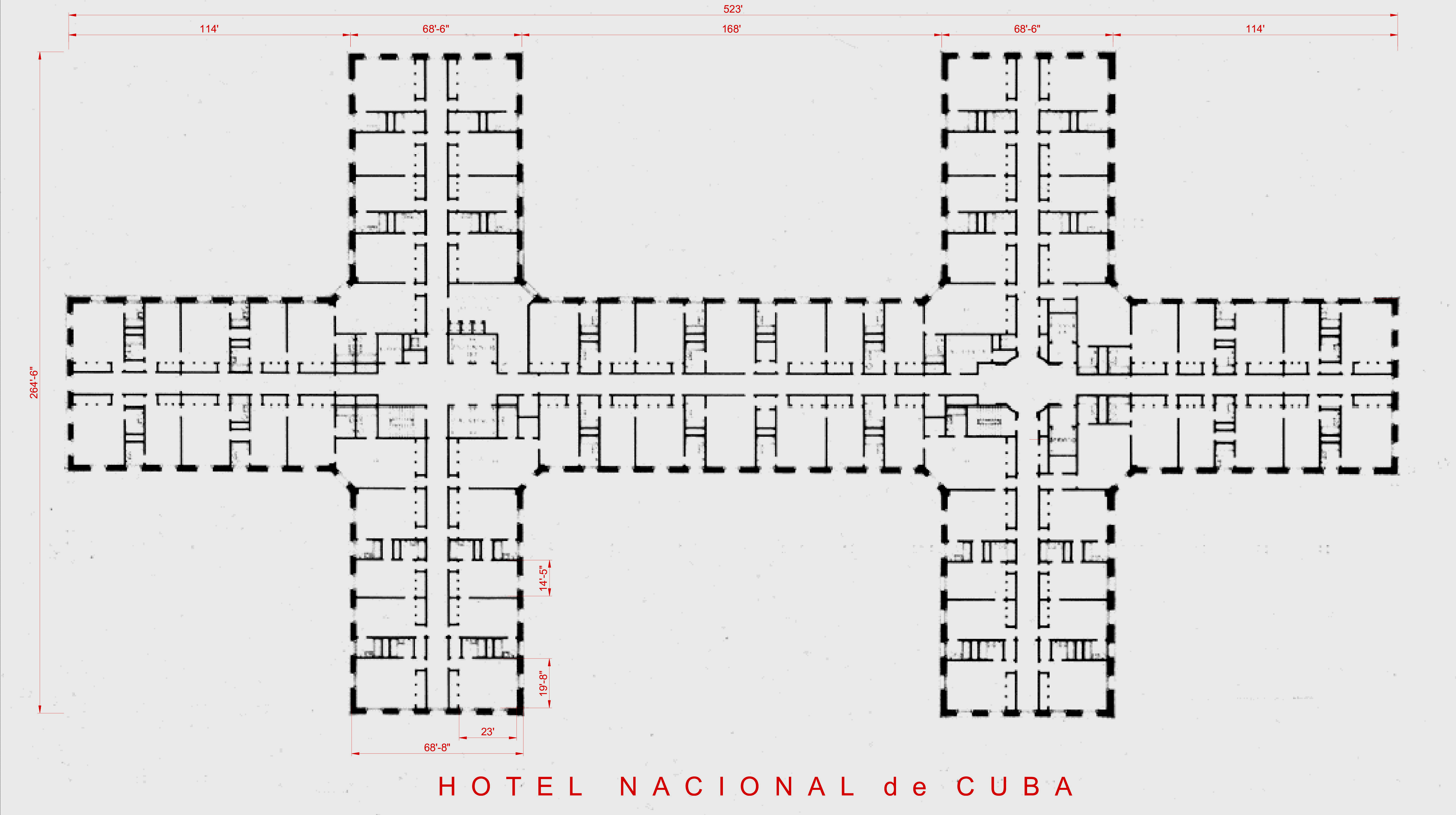
Hotel Nacional, typical floor plan

The Hotel Nacional was designed by the New York architecture firm of McKim, Mead and White, financed by the National City Bank of New York, and constructed in fourteen months by the U.S. engineering firm of Purdy and Henderson. The structure contains a mix of styles, including Sevillian, Roman, Moorish and Art Deco. The Palladian style entrance portico has two stylized column capitals and quoins of coral stone.

The layout of the Hotel Nacional is based on two Greek crosses, giving the majority of the rooms a view of the ocean. The 6 typical floors have 74 rooms and 5,912.4 m^{2} (63,641 sq ft). of floor area. The eighth floor (top floor) has 66 rooms and an area of 4,675.3 m^{2} (50,325 sq ft). The footprint of the building measures approximately 159 m x 81 m. The structure of the building is a steel frame, while the decorative elements including ground floor details, columns, wall facings, and much of the paving, are in coral stone.

=== Early operation ===
The hotel opened as The National Hotel of Cuba on December 30, 1930, operated by the American managers of the Plaza Hotel, Savoy-Plaza Hotel and Copley Plaza Hotel, at a time when Cuba was a prime travel destination for people in the U.S.

In 1933, after Fulgencio Batista's September 4 coup against the transitional government, The National Hotel was the residence of Sumner Welles, a special envoy sent by U. S. President Franklin D. Roosevelt to mediate the crisis. Soon after, on October 2, 1933, it was the site of a bloody siege that would become known as the Battle of the Hotel Nacional of Cuba. The conflict pitted officers of the Cuban army, holed up in the hotel, who had been instrumental in the overthrow of Gerardo Machado but opposed Batista, against the non-commissioned officers and other ranks of the Cuban army, who supported Batista. Their successful assault on the hotel left about 94 combatants dead and caused extensive damage to the building, including shell and bullet holes.

The National Hotel was restored soon after and reopened. In 1939, it was renamed Hotel Nacional de Cuba. Chicago developer Arnold Kirkeby acquired the property in July 1943 and operated it for over a decade as part of his Kirkeby Hotels chain.

=== Havana conference ===
Beginning on December 20, 1946 the hotel hosted the Havana Conference, an infamous mob summit run by Lucky Luciano and Meyer Lansky and attended by Santo Trafficante Jr., Frank Costello, Albert Anastasia, Vito Genovese and many others. Francis Ford Coppola dramatised the conference in his film The Godfather Part II.

Delegates were present representing New York City, New Jersey, Buffalo, Chicago, New Orleans and Florida, with the largest delegation of bosses from the New York-New Jersey area. Several major bosses from the Jewish Syndicate were at the conference to discuss joint La Cosa Nostra-Jewish Syndicate business. According to conference rules, the Jewish delegates could not vote on Cosa Nostra rules or policies; however, the Jewish crime bosses were allowed input on any joint business ventures, such as the Flamingo Hotel.

Luciano opened the Havana Conference by discussing a topic that would greatly affect his authority within the American Mafia; the position of "capo di tutti capi" or "boss of all bosses". The last official boss of all bosses had been Salvatore Maranzano, who was murdered in September 1931. By the end of 1931, Luciano had eliminated this top position and re-organized the Italian mafia into "La Cosa Nostra", or "This Thing of Ours". A board of directors, commonly called the "Commission", had been formed to oversee criminal activities, control rules, and set policies. La Cosa Nostra thus became the top criminal organization within the National Crime Syndicate.

Now Luciano could easily have declared himself as Maranzano's heir in 1932; instead, Luciano decided to exercise control behind the scenes. This arrangement had worked until Vito Genovese's return from Italy. Officially, Genovese was now just a caporegime; however, he had made it clear that he intended to take control of the Luciano crime family. Since Luciano's deportation in 1946, Luciano ally Frank Costello had been the acting boss of the Luciano family. As a result, tensions between the Costello and Genovese factions had started to fester. Luciano had no intention of stepping down as family boss; he had to do something about Genovese. Luciano also realized that Genovese threatened his overall authority and influence within the American mafia, probably with support from other crime bosses. Therefore, Luciano decided to resurrect the boss of all bosses position and claim it for himself. He hoped the other bosses would support him, either by officially affirming the title or at least by acknowledging that he was still "First Amongst Equals".

At the conference, Luciano allegedly presented the motion to retain his position as the top boss in La Cosa Nostra. Then Luciano ally, Albert "The Mad Hatter" Anastasia seconded the motion. Anastasia voted with Luciano because he felt threatened by Genovese's attempts to muscle in on his waterfront rackets. Checkmated by the Luciano-Costello-Anastasia alliance, Genovese was forced to swallow his ambitions and plan for the future. To further embarrass Genovese, Luciano encouraged Anastasia and Genovese to settle their differences and shake hands in front of the other bosses. This symbolic gesture was meant to prevent another bloody gang war such as the Castellammarese War of 1930–1931. With Luciano solidifying his personal position and squashing Genovese's ambition for now, Luciano brought up discussion of the mob's narcotics operations in the United States.

=== 1950s heyday ===
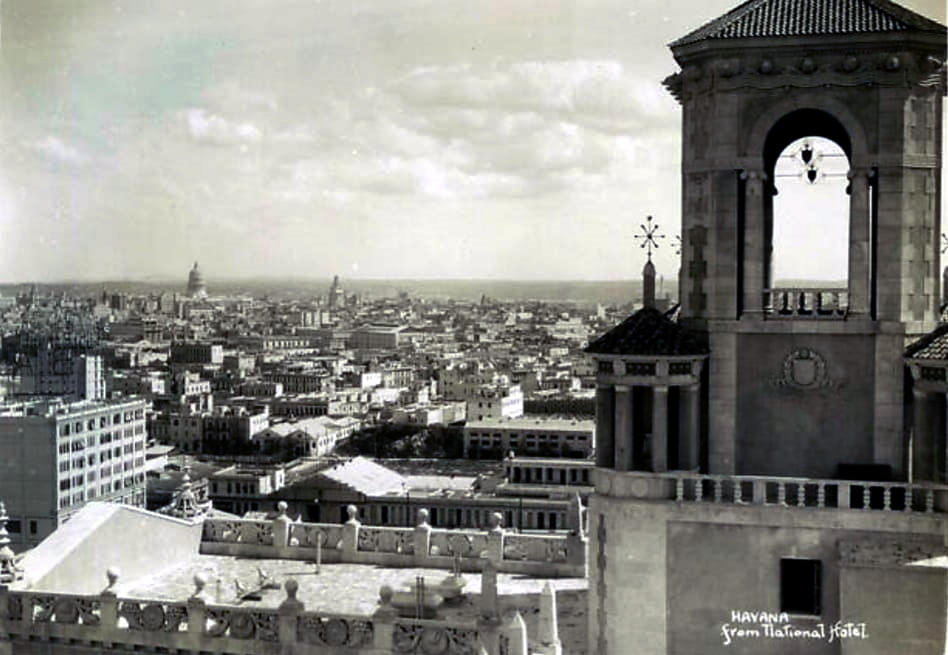
Hotel Nacional tower-roof detail.

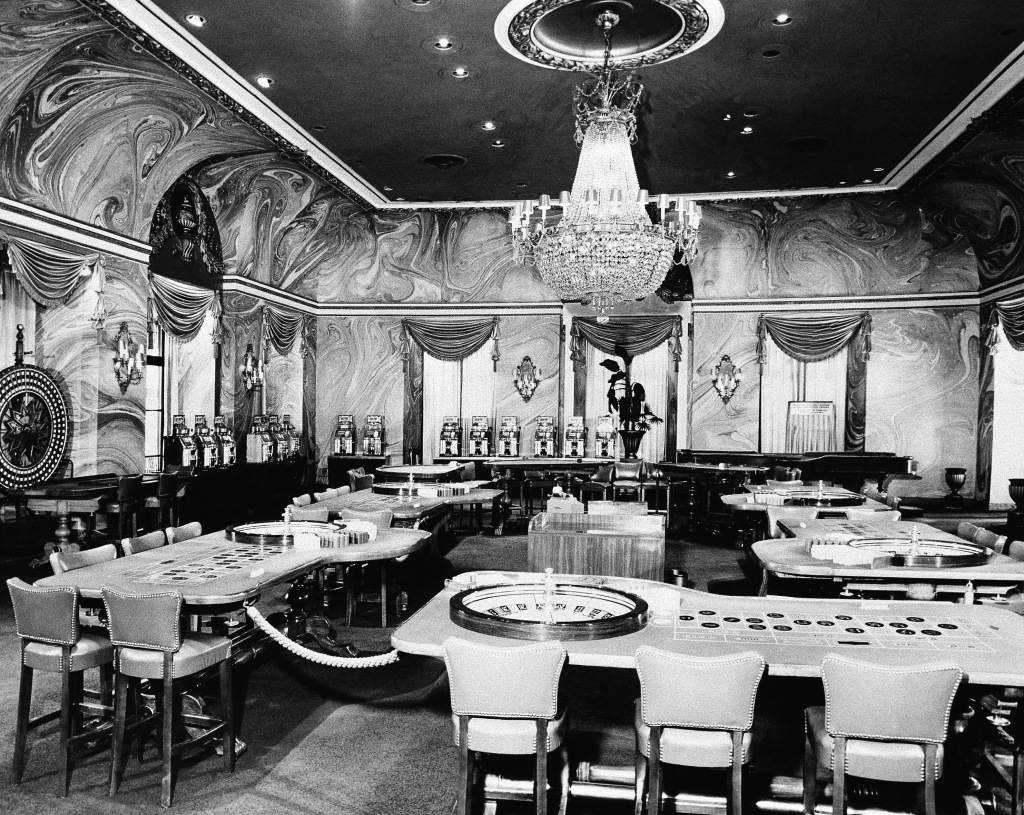
Inside the Casino Internacional in the 1950s

In September 1955, Kirkeby Hotels Corp. sold the Hotel Nacional to a newly formed Cuban company, Corporacion Intercontinental de Hoteles, S.A., with Pan Am's Intercontinental Hotel Corp. division assuming partial ownership and also management of the property. Alphons Landa, a prominent Washington attorney, represented Pan Am and arranged for other clients and friends to acquire shares in the hotel's ownership at the same time. Dave Beck, President of the Teamsters and Roy Fruehauf of the Fruehauf Trailer Corporation were silent partners for at least two years. Fruehauf would sell his interest in the hotel in May 1957; other investors would lose everything when Castro came to power. Lansky planned to take a wing of the ten-storey hotel and create luxury suites for high-stakes gamblers. Batista endorsed Lansky's idea even though there were objections from American expatriates such as Ernest Hemingway. Under Lansky's impetus, a wing of the grand entrance hall was refurbished to include a bar, a restaurant, a showroom and a luxurious casino. It was operated by Lansky and his brother Jake, with Wilbur Clark as the front man.

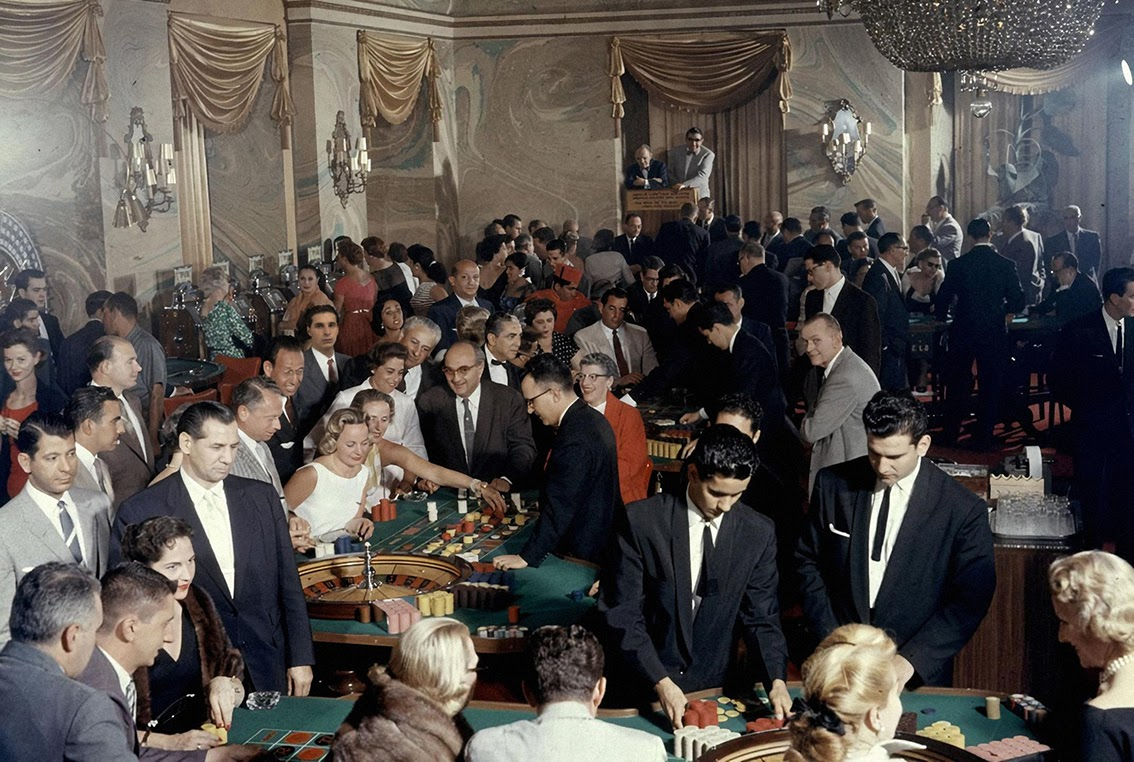
The Casino Internacional in the late 50s

The new wing of the hotel, consisting of Wilbur Clark's Casino Internacional, the adjoining Starlight Terrace Bar, and the Casino Parisién night club (home of the Famous Dancing Waters), opened in 1956 with a performance by Eartha Kitt, who became the hotel's first black guest. The casino and clubs were an immediate success. According to an unpublished article sent to Cuban Information Archives around 1956–57, "The bar was tended by local bartenders, and the casino managed by gentlemen from Las Vegas." By the spring of 1957 the casino, sublet by the hotel for a substantial rent to Lansky, was bringing in as much cash as the biggest casinos in Las Vegas. In late 1958 the casino was sold to Michael McLaney and Carroll Rosenbloom.

=== Post-Cuban Revolution ===
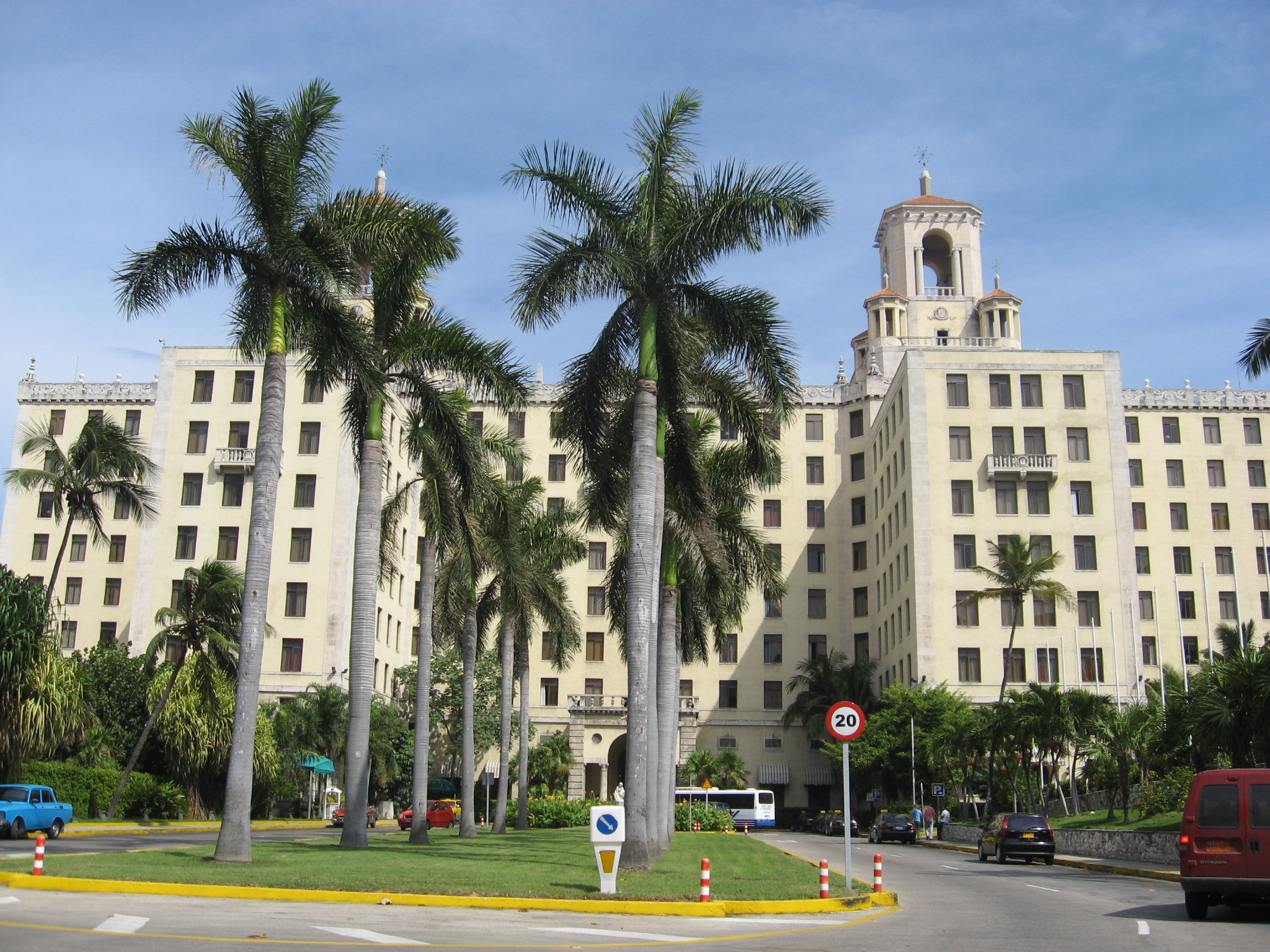
Hotel Nacional de Cuba in 2007

Following the Cuban Revolution in January 1959, Havana's casinos were briefly shut down, but were quickly reopened after protests by casino workers left out of work. The Nacional suffered heavy financial losses in the months that followed, and as a direct result, the Intercontinental Hotels division of PanAm reported a net loss of $154,000 in 1959, after reporting a profit of $200,000 in 1958. Fidel Castro nationalized the hotel in June 1960, seizing it from Intercontinental Hotels, which resulted in the hotel chain posting a net loss of $71,000 in 1960. Castro finally closed the casino in October 1960, almost two years after his overthrow of Batista.

During the Cuban Missile Crisis, anti-aircraft guns were set up on the site of the Santa Clara Battery and an extensive series of tunnels were built under the property, which are now open to the public on guided tours.

After years of neglect due to the reduction in tourism following the revolution, the hotel was mainly used to accommodate visiting diplomats and foreign government officials. The collapse of the USSR in 1991 forced the Cuban communist party, anxious for foreign exchange reserves, to reopen Cuba to tourists.

In September 1997, the hotel was the target of a bomb attack. The action was intended to hit tourism.

In 2017 the hotel was one of several sites of a suspected acoustic attack against American diplomats, described as "Havana syndrome". Reports of piercing, high-pitched noises and inexplicable ailments were investigated, but a source of the phenomenon was never definitively determined.

== Famous guests ==
In 1956, singer Nat King Cole was contracted to perform in Cuba and wanted to stay at the Hotel Nacional de Cuba, but was not allowed to because the hotel was segregated. The hotel had earlier turned away black celebrities including Joe Louis, Marian Anderson, Jackie Robinson and Josephine Baker. Cole honored his contract, and the concert at the Tropicana was a huge success. The following year, he returned to Cuba for another concert, singing many songs in Spanish. There is now a tribute to him in the form of a statue and a jukebox in the Hotel Nacional.

Jean-Paul Sartre stayed at the hotel just after the Revolution in 1960, with his wife, the philosopher, Simone de Beauvoir. The couple interviewed Che Guevara, and Sartre wrote 'Sartre visits Cuba', which was published in Havana in 1961, narrating his experiences. The hotel has since named the room he stayed in after him.

In its 80+ years of existence, the Hotel Nacional has had many important guests, including artists, actors, athletes and writers such as Winston Churchill, the Duke and Duchess of Windsor, Jimmy Carter, Frank Sinatra, Ava Gardner, Rita Hayworth, Mickey Mantle, Johnny Weissmuller, Buster Keaton, Jorge Negrete, Agustín Lara, Rocky Marciano, Tyrone Power, Rómulo Gallegos, Errol Flynn, John Wayne, Marlene Dietrich, Gary Cooper, Marlon Brando, Ernest Hemingway, Yuri Gagarin, scientist Alexander Fleming, Minnesota (United States) Governor Jesse Ventura, and innumerable Ibero-American Heads of State and European monarchs.

== Hill of Taganana ==
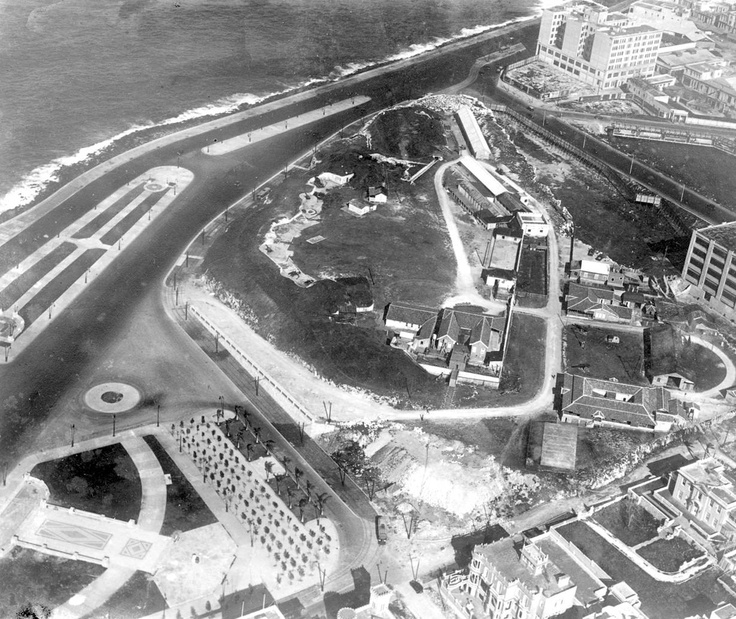
Battery of Santa Clara on Hill of Taganana, before construction of the hotel, circa 1920s.

The Santa Clara Battery was built on top of a hill which was home to one of the most historic caves on the island. The hill of Taganana, located in the coastal outcrop of Punta Brava near the cove of San Lázaro took its name from a cavern in the Canary Islands where the princess Guanche Cathaysa took refuge. She was captured and sold by the Castilians as a slave in 1494. The 7-year-old Guanche girl from Taganana (in Santa Cruz de Tenerife) was taken captive along with four other youngsters (Cathayta, Inopona, Cherohisa and Ithaisa). Cathayta was sold as a slave with her companions in Valencia, in April 1494. It is believed that after this she spent the rest of her life somewhere in Spain as a Menina for some woman of the Spanish high society.

In Cuba, in a parallel legend that states that one of the caves under the Taganana hill served as a shelter for a Cuban Indian girl of the same name who fled from her Spanish persecutors.

The Cuban novelist Cirilo Villaverde immortalized Guanche Cathaysa in his literary work, La Cueva de Taganana.

== Gallery ==
Hotel Nacional de Cuba

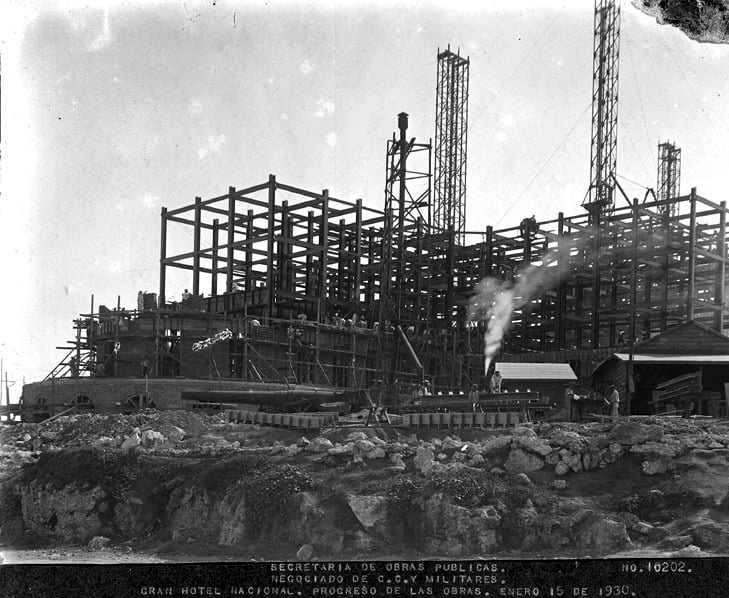
Progress photo of construction

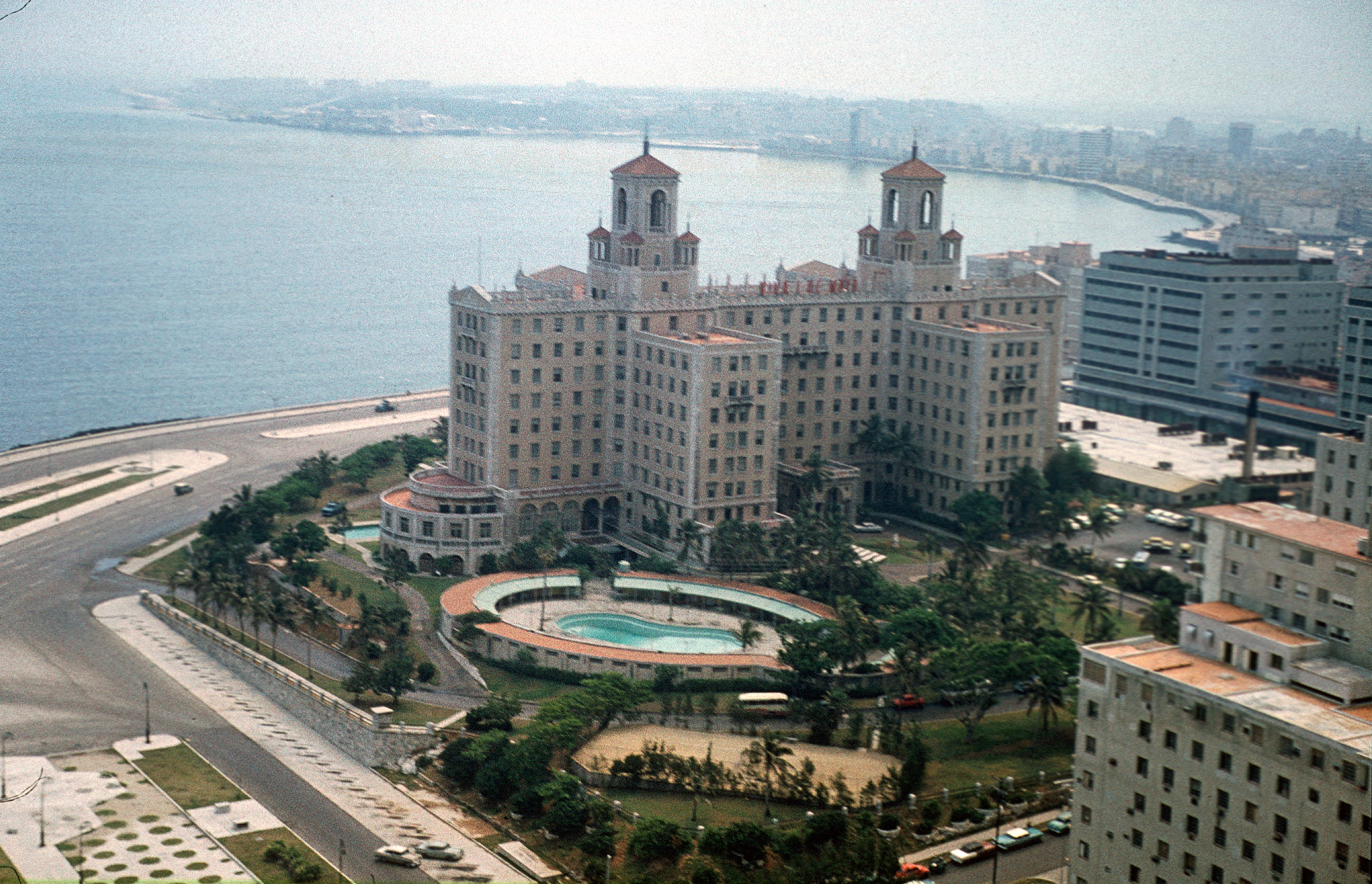
Hotel Nacional de Cuba, 1973

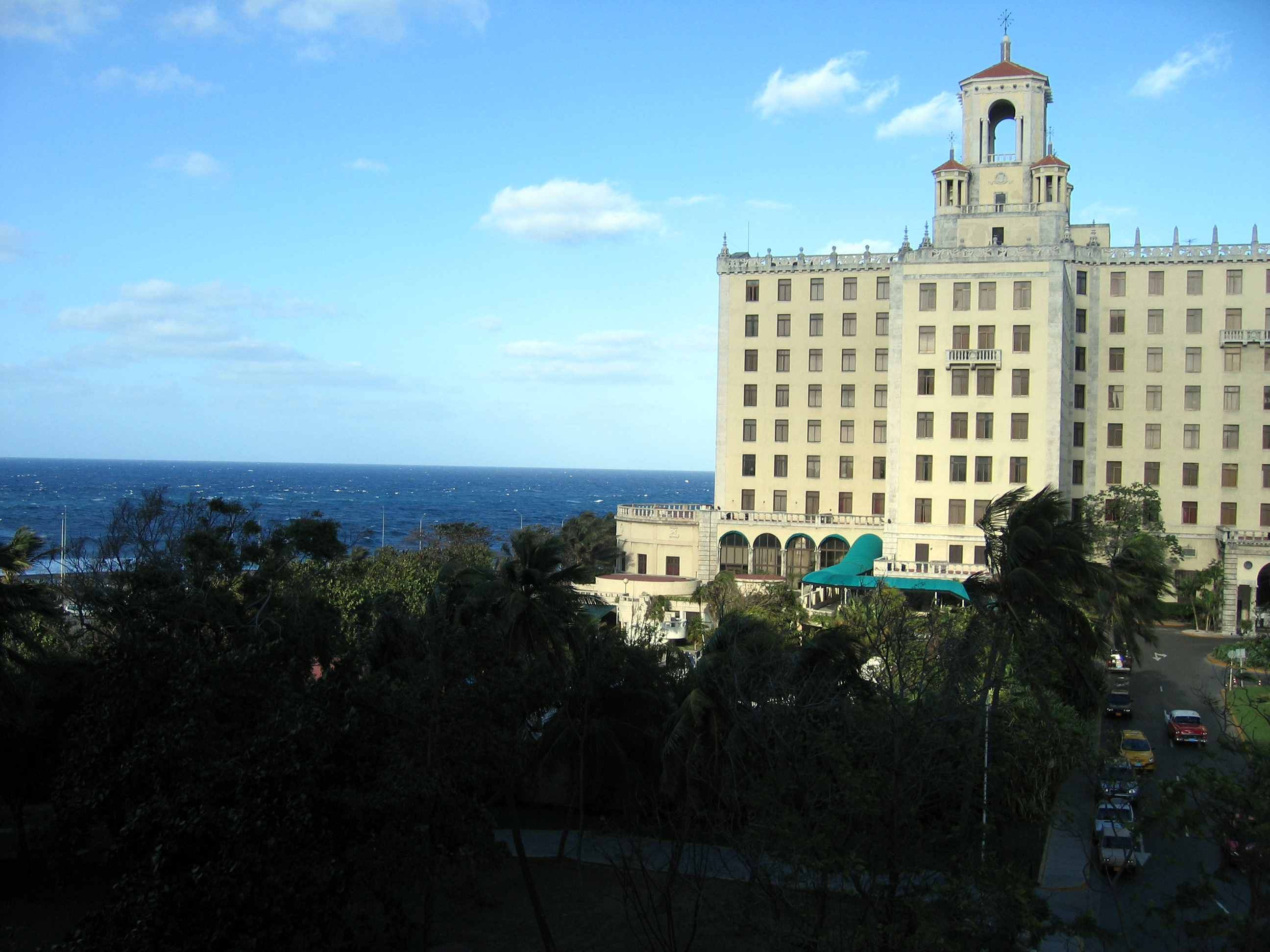
Hotel Nacional, January 2006

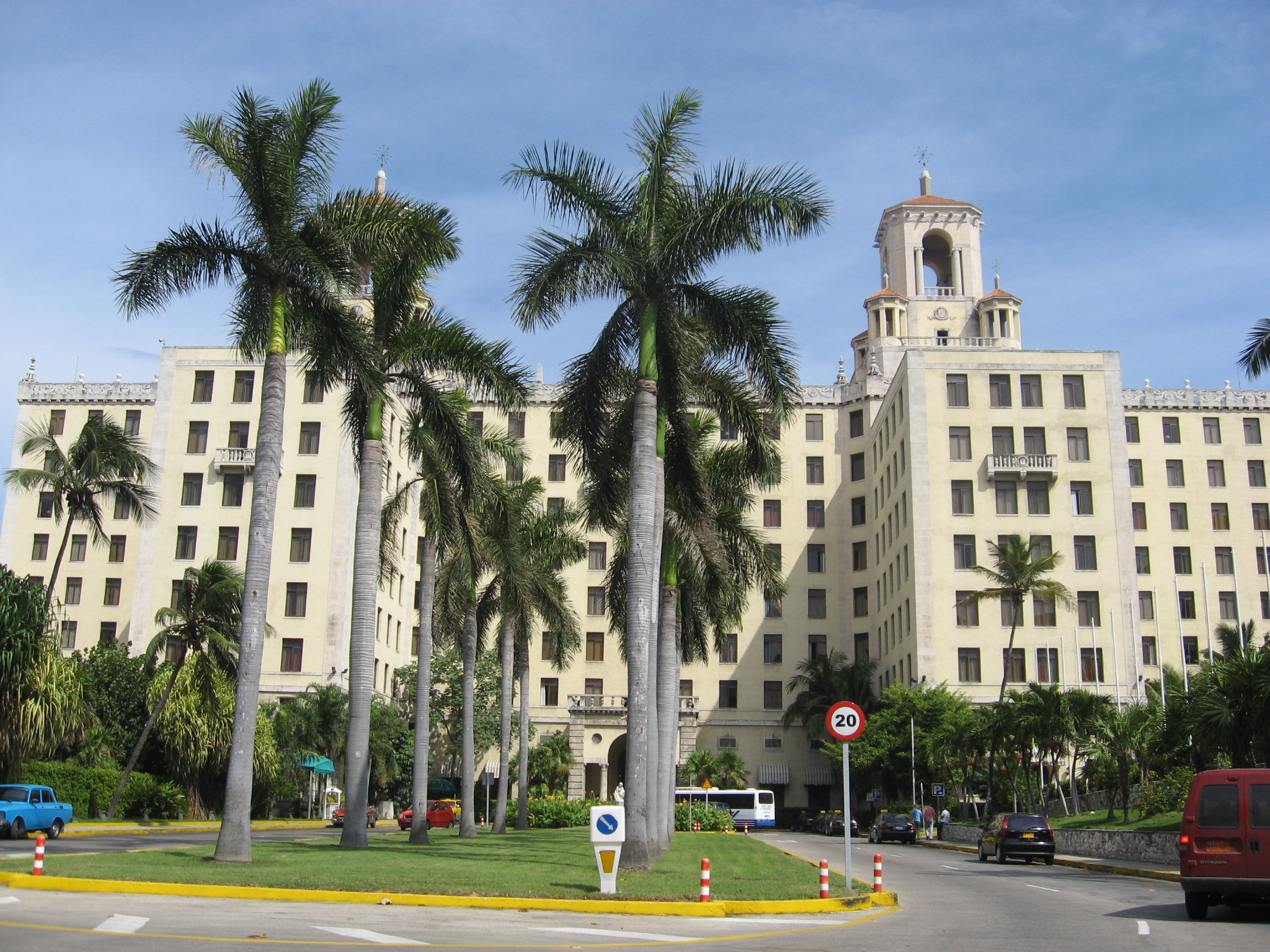
Hotel Nacional, January 2008

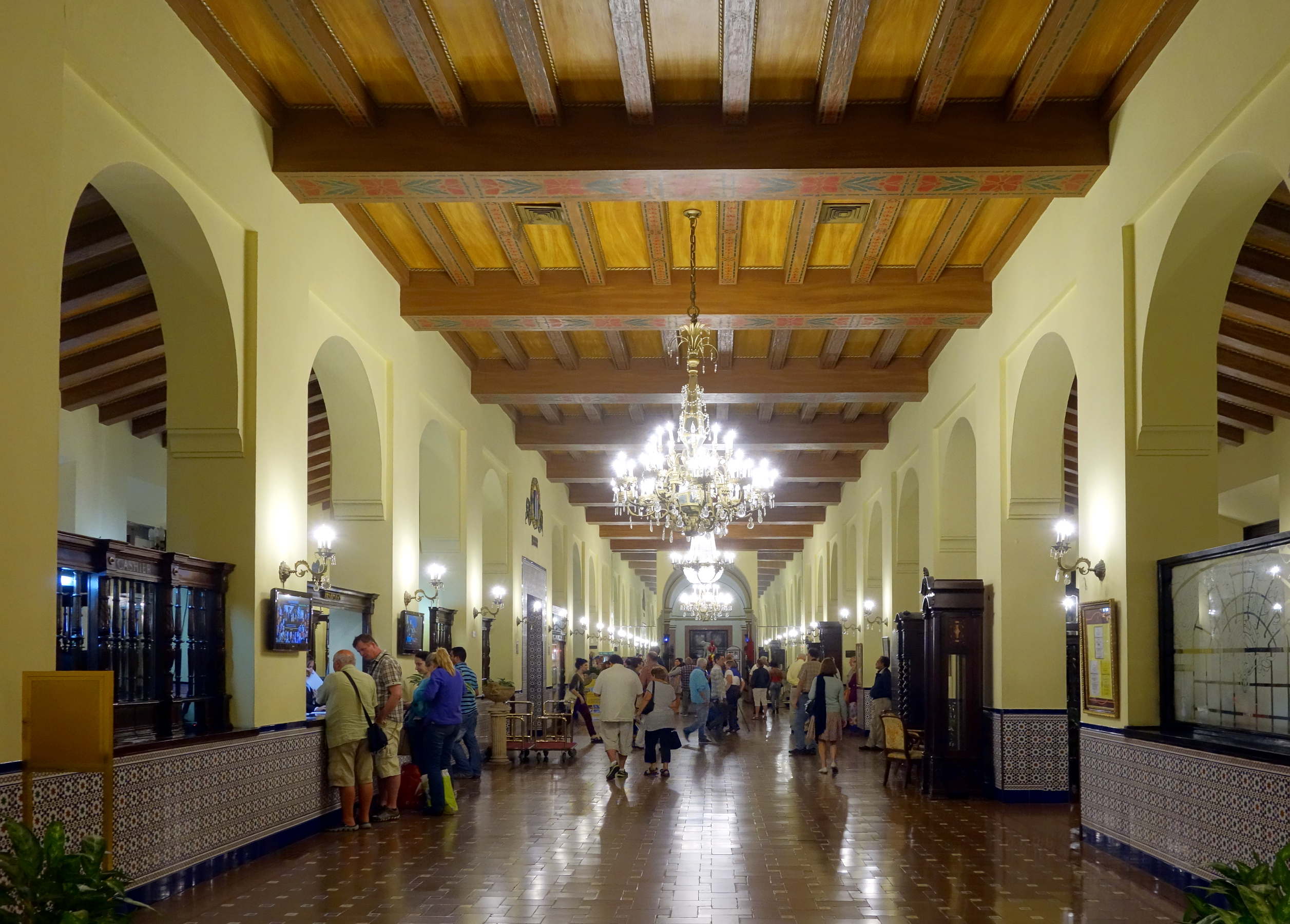
The lobby as seen in 2015

== See also ==
- Barrio de San Lázaro, Havana
- FOCSA Building
- Monument to the Victims of the USS Maine (Havana)
- Purdy and Henderson, Engineers
