= Cayo Hueso, Havana =

Cayo Hueso
- Ward of Havana
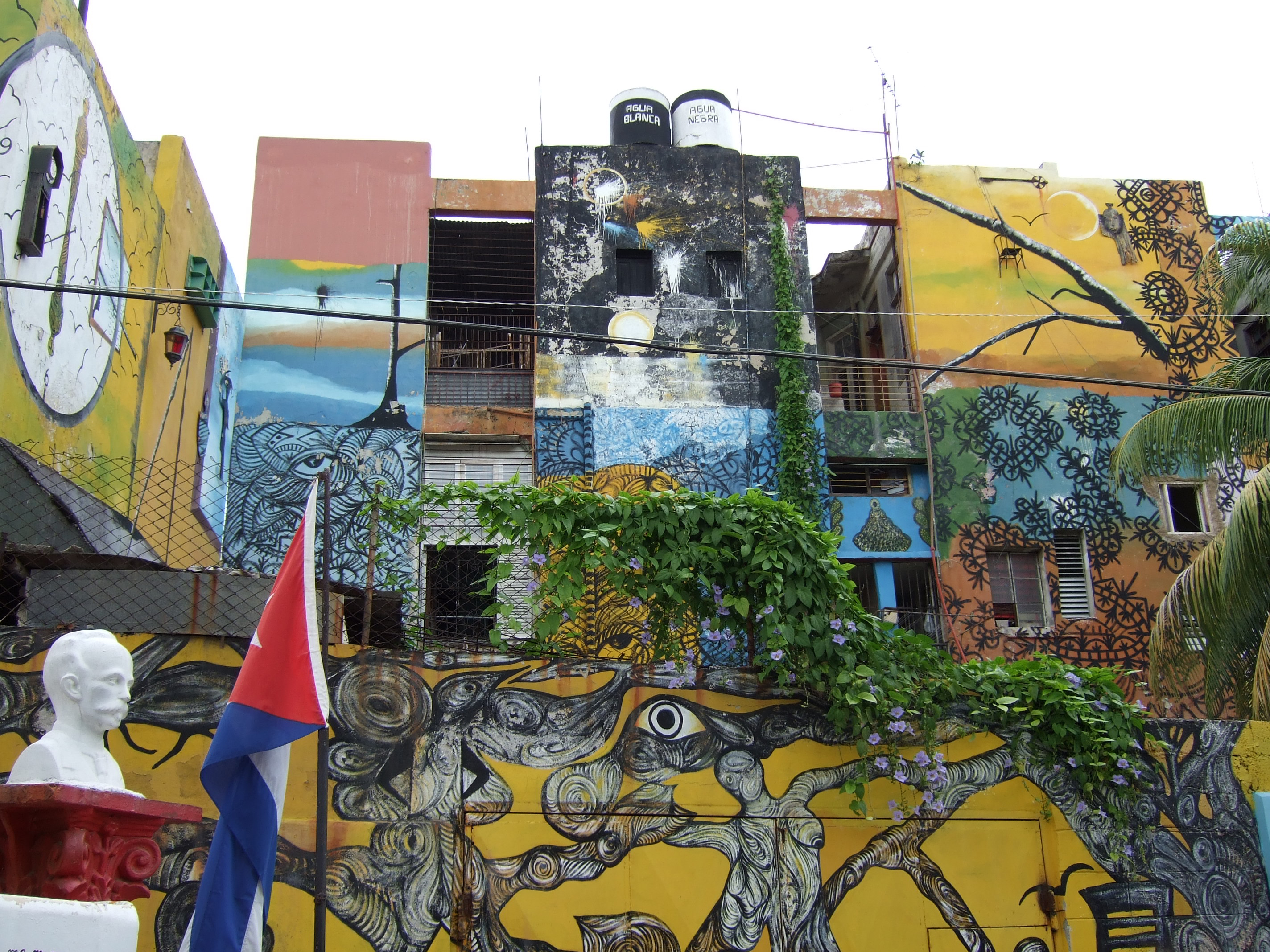
- Callejón de Hamel

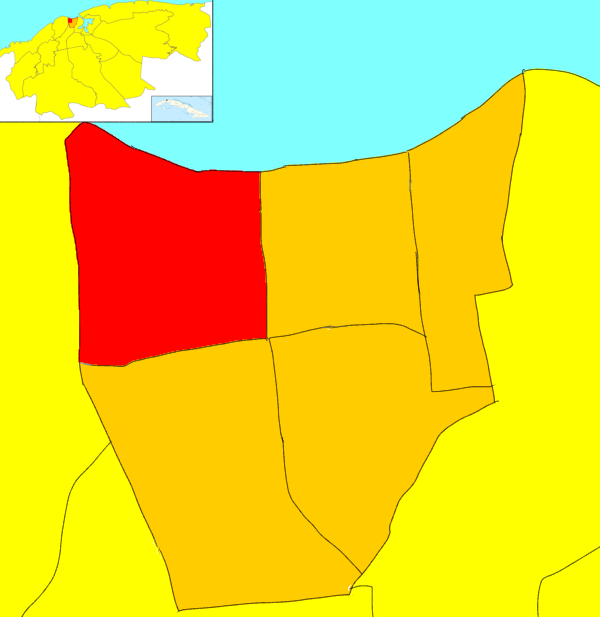
- Location of Cayo Hueso in Centro Habana
- Coordinates: 23°8′13″N 82°22′27″W
- Country: Cuba
- Province: Ciudad de La Habana
- Municipality: Centro Habana

Population
  - Total: 34,325
- Time zone: EST
- Area code: (+53) 7

Cayo Hueso is a consejo popular (ward) in the municipality of Centro Habana, Havana, Cuba. A traditionally working-class neighborhood populated by Afro-Cubans, it is known for its many cultural landmarks such as the Callejón de Hamel, the Fragua Martiana Museum and the Parque de los Mártires Universitarios.

Although Cayo Hueso today is considered part of Centro Havana, originally it formed part of Barrio San Lázaro, an area bounded by Calle Infanta to the west, Calle Zanja to the south, Calle Belascoáin to the east and the Gulf of Mexico to the north. Cayo Hueso was declared a barrio on 26 July 1912, and made part of Centro Habana upon its establishment in 1963.

== History ==
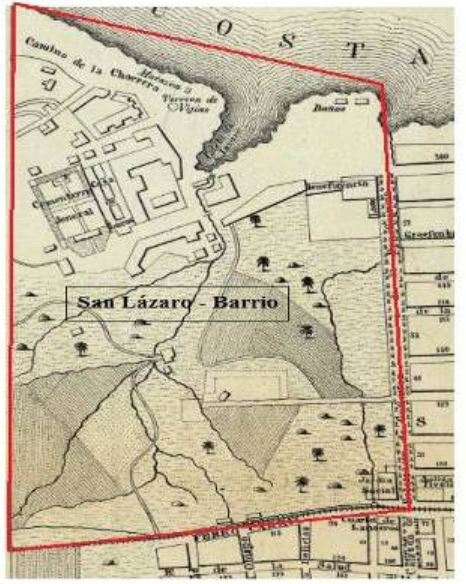
Map of barrio San Lázaro, 1855.

The earliest settlement in the current area of Cayo Hueso dates back to the second half of the 16th century, following the burning of Havana by French pirate Jacques de Sores. It wasn't until 1912 that the area was officially recognized as the neighbourhood of Cayo Hueso. Its name, which means "bone cay", derives from the fact that the Espada Cemetery was located there; it was demolished in 1908. Among the oldest institutions in the area were the leprosy hospital (demolished in 1916), the Casa de Beneficencia orphanage (replaced by the Hermanos Ameijeiras hospital), and the San Dionisio mental asylum which operated between 1828 and 1860. The asylum was located between the cemetery and the San Lázaro hospital, and named after the then governor of Cuba, Francisco Dionisio Vives.

Modern sights include the art deco Edificio Solimar, built in 1944; the Casa Marina, a former brothel; and the Fragua Martiana Museum, dedicated to the "father" of the Cuban nation, José Martí. The museum occupies the site of the old San Lázaro quarry, where Martí and other prisoners were imprisoned. The Convento e Iglesia del Carmen, one of the largest churches in Havana, is also located in Cayo Hueso. Every year, a march known as the Marcha de las Antorchas (March of the Torches) takes place in the area to celebrate Martí's birthday. The Parque de los Mártires Universitarios commemorates the fallen university students who fought against the Machado and Batista regimes.

Traditionally a black worker's neighbourhood, Cayo Hueso has been subject of various renovation plans. In 1984, the Cuban government began allowing rent money to count towards the purchase of properties, which led to generalized improvements to many buildings in Cayo Hueso. In 1988, Cayo Hueso was one of the first three neighbourhoods to take part in the Talleres de Transformación Integral de los Barrios (Comprehensive Workshops for Neighborhood Change). Between 1995 and 1999, an urban health improvement project, known as Plan Cayo Hueso, was developed. Since the 1990s many environmental initiatives have taken place in the ward.

== Culture ==
Cayo Hueso is home to various cultural sites such as the Callejón de Hamel, an alleyway decorated since 1990 by Salvador Gonzáles Escalona, in which events such as workshops and rumba performances take place regularly. Similarly, the Callejón del Poeta (The Poet's Alley), dedicated to obscure German poet George Wearth, is home to poetry readings. In 1997, the 14th edition of the World Festival of Youth and Students took place in Cayo Hueso.

Cayo Hueso has its own comparsa (Cuban carnival group), known as Los Componedores de Batea, which was established in 1908. Among the musicians born in Cayo Hueso are trumpeters Félix Chappottín and Mario Bauzá, singers Omara Portuondo and Sara González Gómez, and percussionist Pedrito Martínez. Other musicians famously resided in the neighbourhood, such as Chano Pozo and Miguelito Valdés. In 1924, the Jóvenes del Cayo was formed, a band which would feature Valdés and other successful musicians from the area. The filin movement was largely concentrated in Cayo Hueso, particularly in a house on the Callejón de Hamel, where trovadores Tirso and Ángel Díaz hosted events with other influential musicians such as César Portillo de la Luz and José Antonio Méndez. The popular 1960s group Los Zafiros, which continued the filin style and was directed by a former member of the Jóvenes del Cayo, Néstor Milí, was also formed in Cayo Hueso.
