= Centro Habana =

- Municipality of Havana
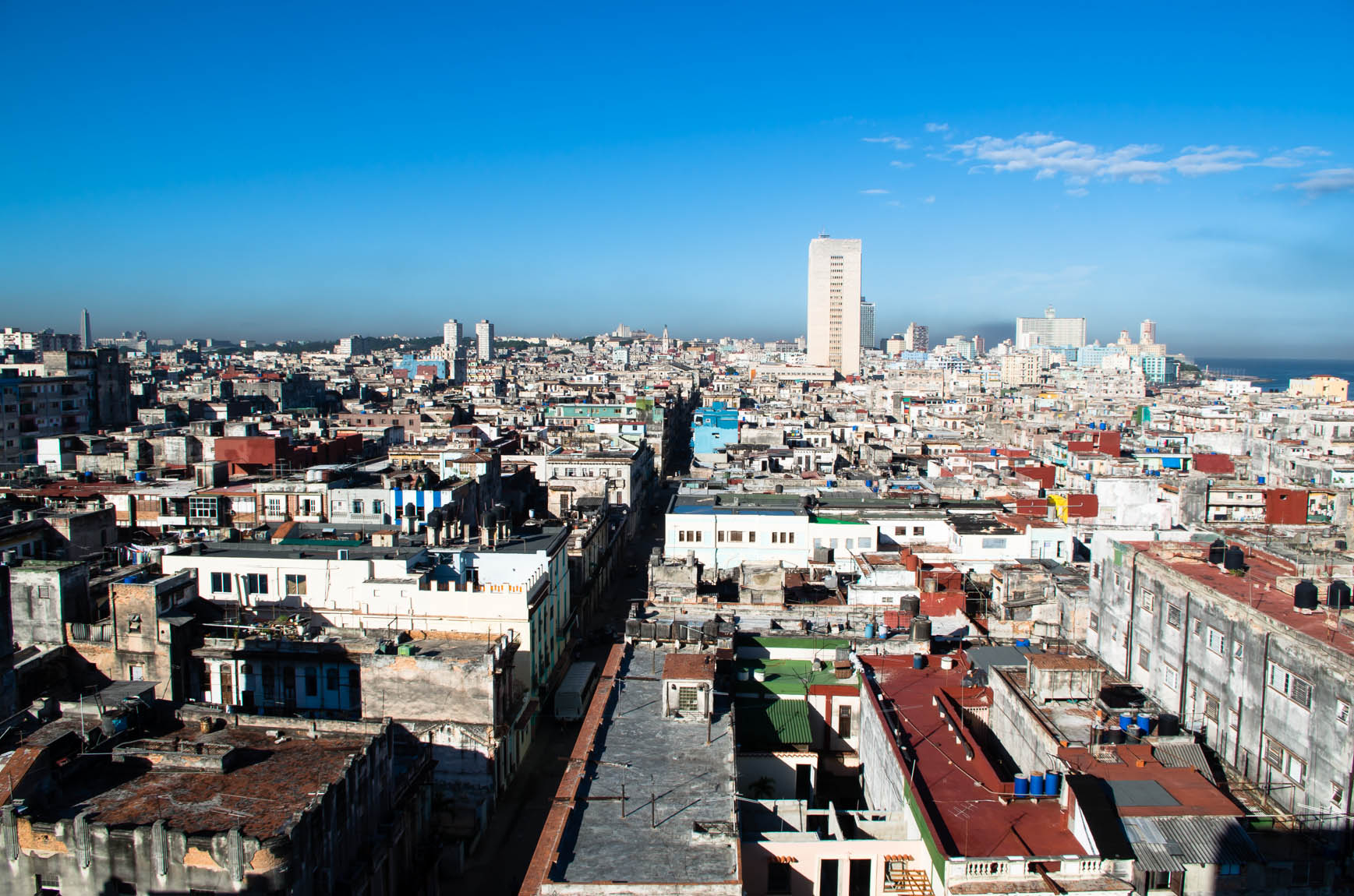
- Centro Havana seen from Hotel Habana Libre

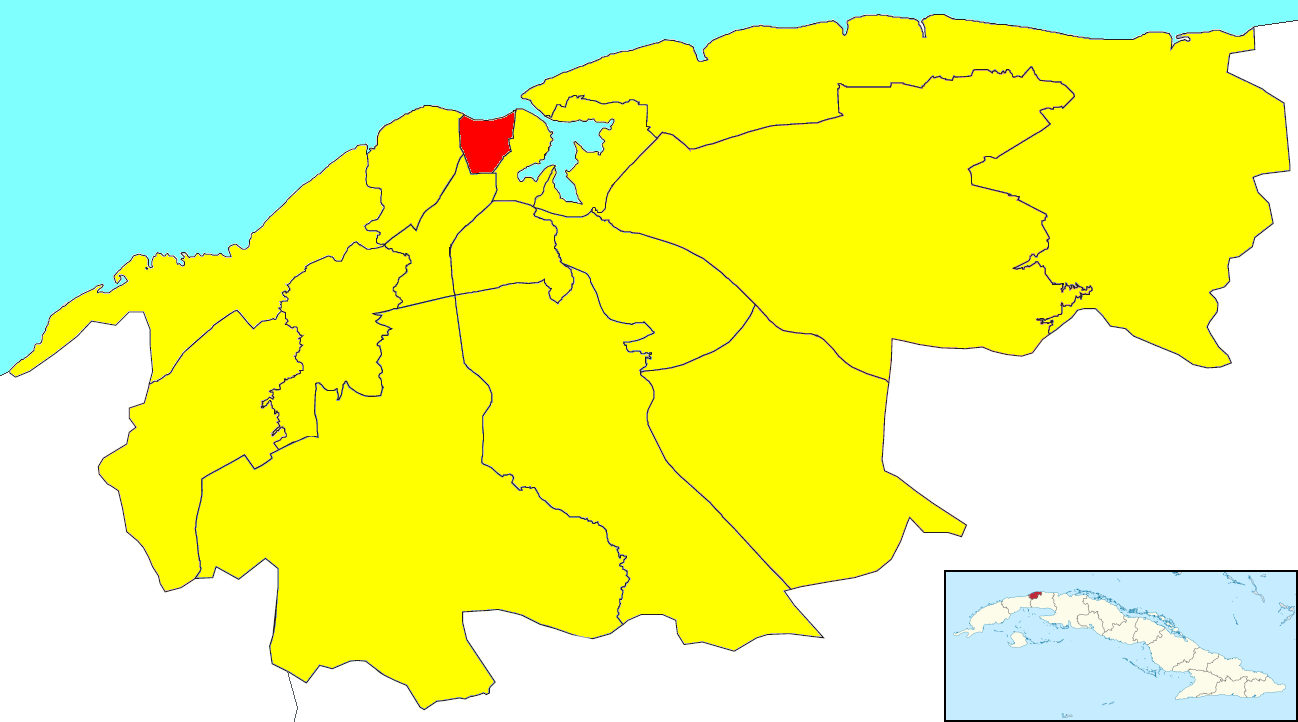
- Location of Centro Habana in Havana
- Coordinates: 23°08′0″N 82°23′0″W
- Country: Cuba
- Province: Ciudad de La Habana
- Wards (Consejos Populares): Cayo Hueso, Colón, Dragones, Los Sitios, Pueblo Nuevo

Area
  - Total: 4 km^{2} (1.5 sq mi)
- Elevation: 45 m (148 ft)

Population (2021)
  - Total: 132,451
  - Density: 33,000/km^{2} (86,000/sq mi)
- Time zone: UTC-5 (EST)
- Area code: +53-7

Centro Habana is one of the 15 municipalities in the city of Havana, Cuba. A chinatown, Barrio Chino, is also located here. It is a smaller municipality of Havana, and it has the highest population density.

Centro Habana is divided into five consejos populares (wards): Cayo Hueso, Colón, Dragones, Los Sitios and Pueblo Nuevo.

It is the part of the city located in the polygon bounded by the Malecón, the Paseo del Prado, Maximo Gómez, Arroyo and Infanta streets.

== History ==
The infrastructure of the city, built 450 years ago, heavily deteriorated during the 1990s after the collapse of the Cuban–Soviet trade partnership. In 1996, restoration projects were started to improve housing and infrastructure in the Cayo Hueso community.

Centro Habana was established as an administrative division in 1963 and later formally made its own municipio in 1976.

== Demographics ==
In 2004, the municipality of Centro Habana had a population of 158,151. With a total area of 4 km^{2} (1.5 sq mi), it has a population density of 39,537.8 inhabitants per square kilometre (102,402/sq mi). In 2023 Centro Habana had a population of 126.105. It has a population density of 36,872 inhabitants per square kilometre (95,500/sq mi).

== See also ==
- Malecon
- Barrio de San Lázaro
- Havana Plan Piloto

== Gallery ==
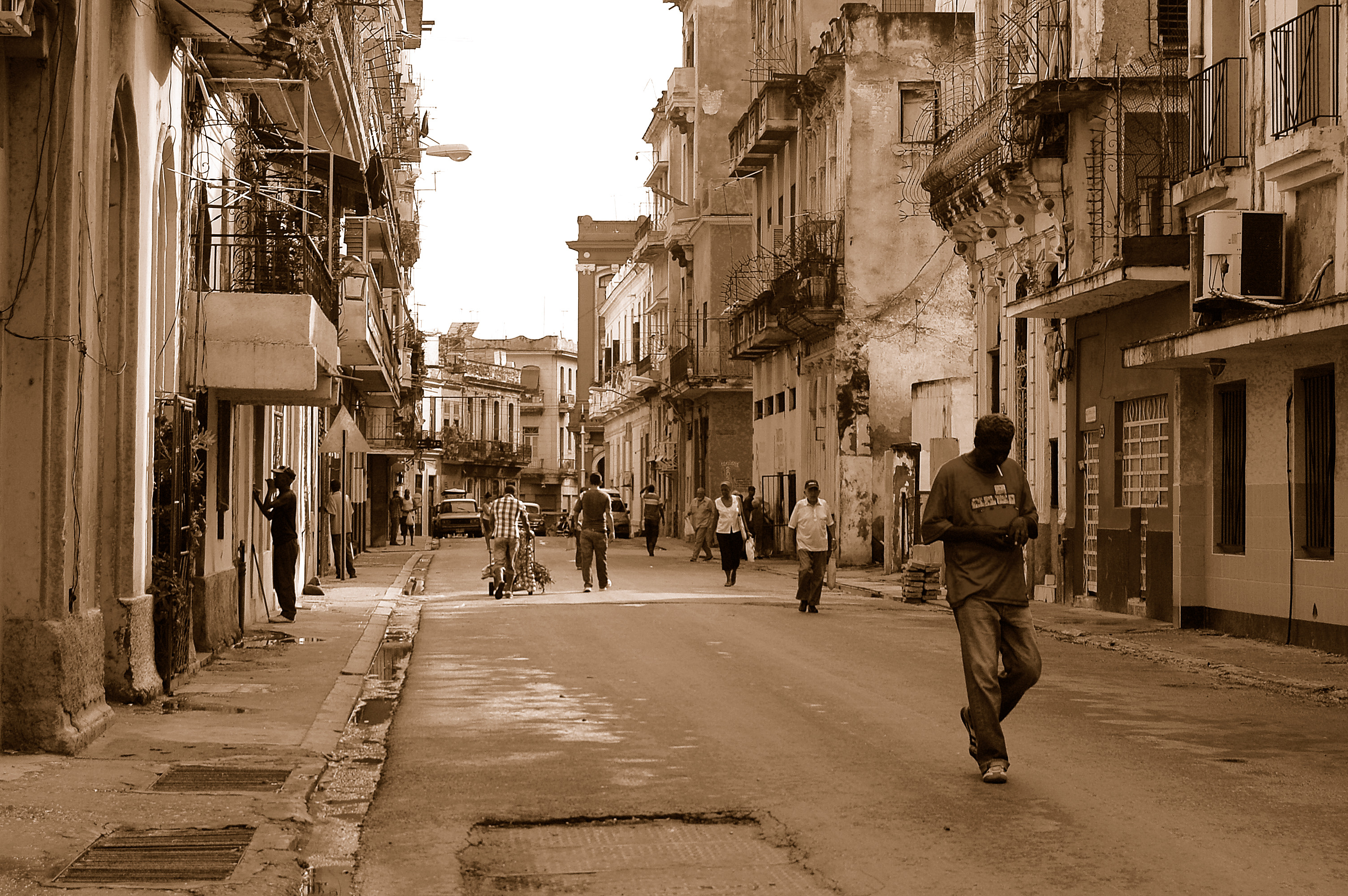
Calle Lazaro (close to the Malecon).

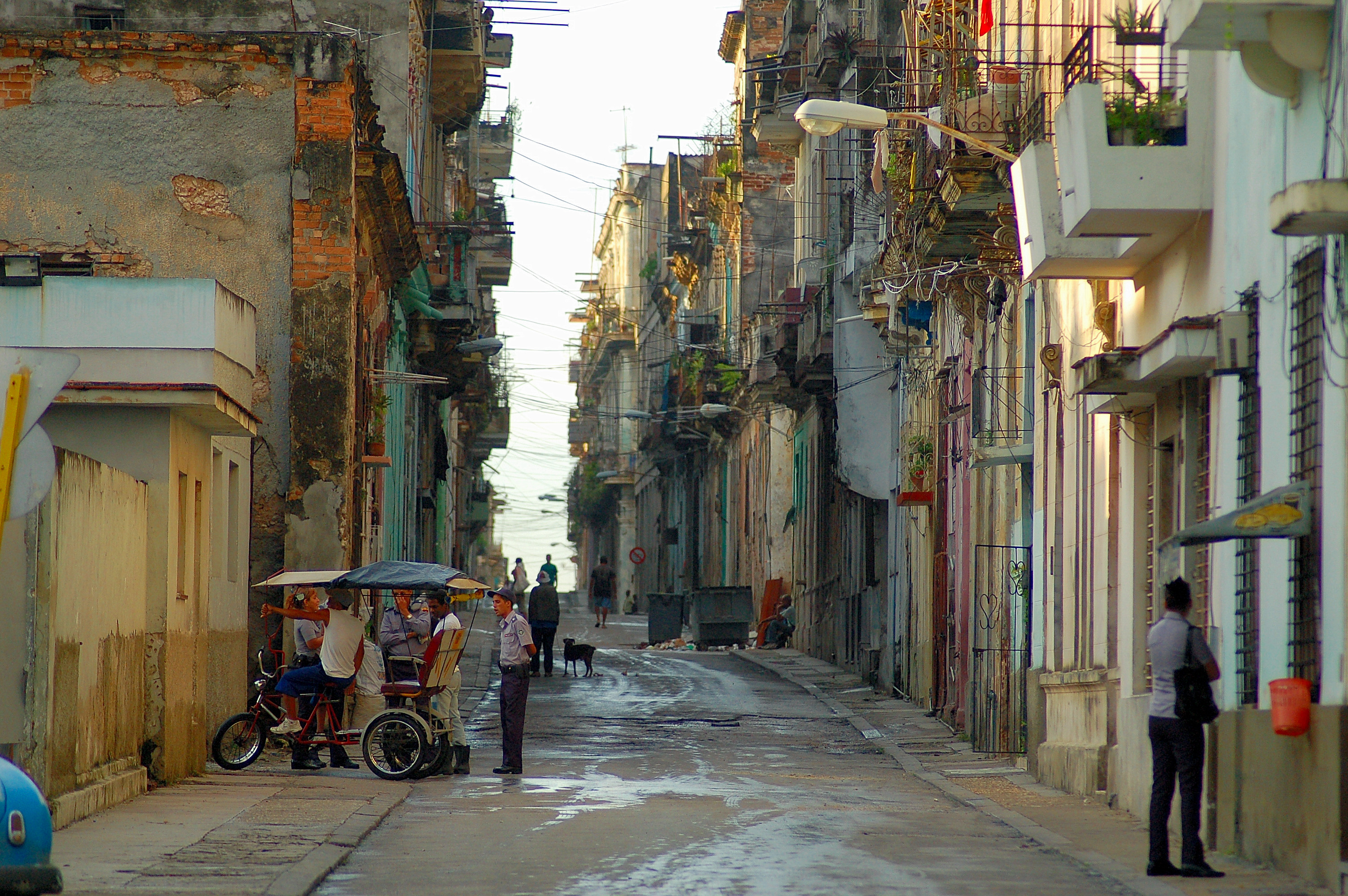
Calle Lealtad.

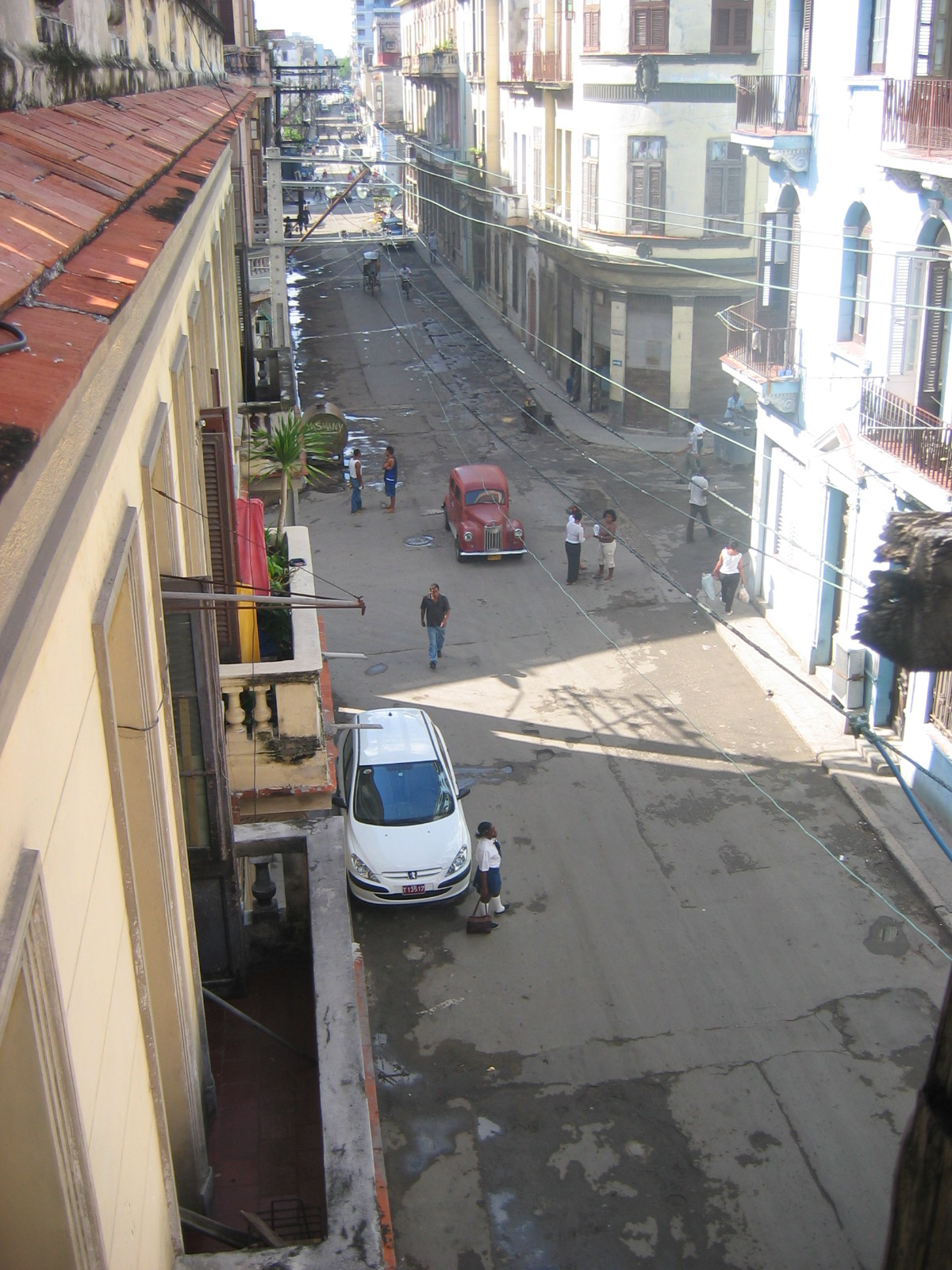
Calle Hospital.

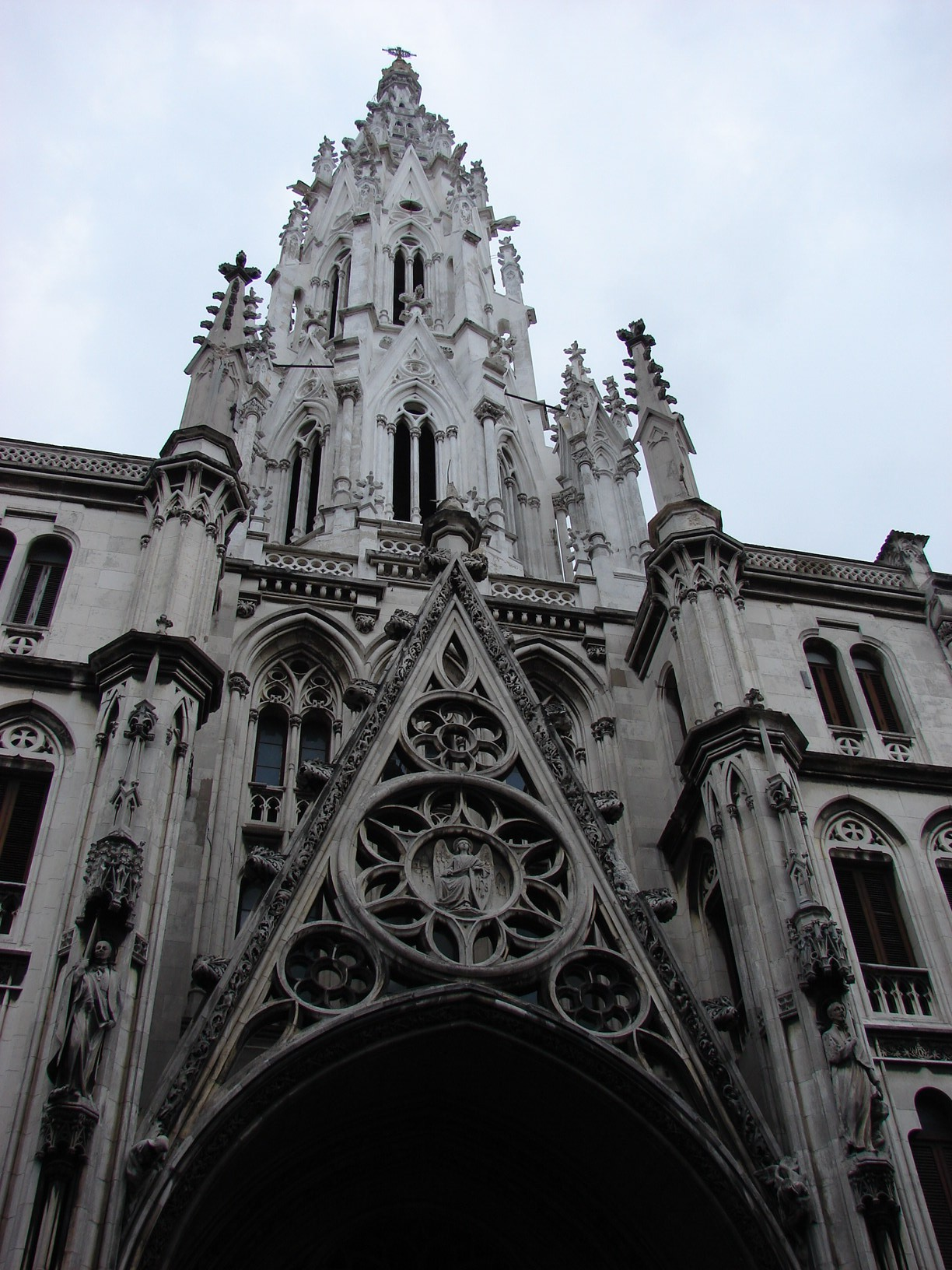
Church of the Sacred Heart of Jesus in Calle Reina.

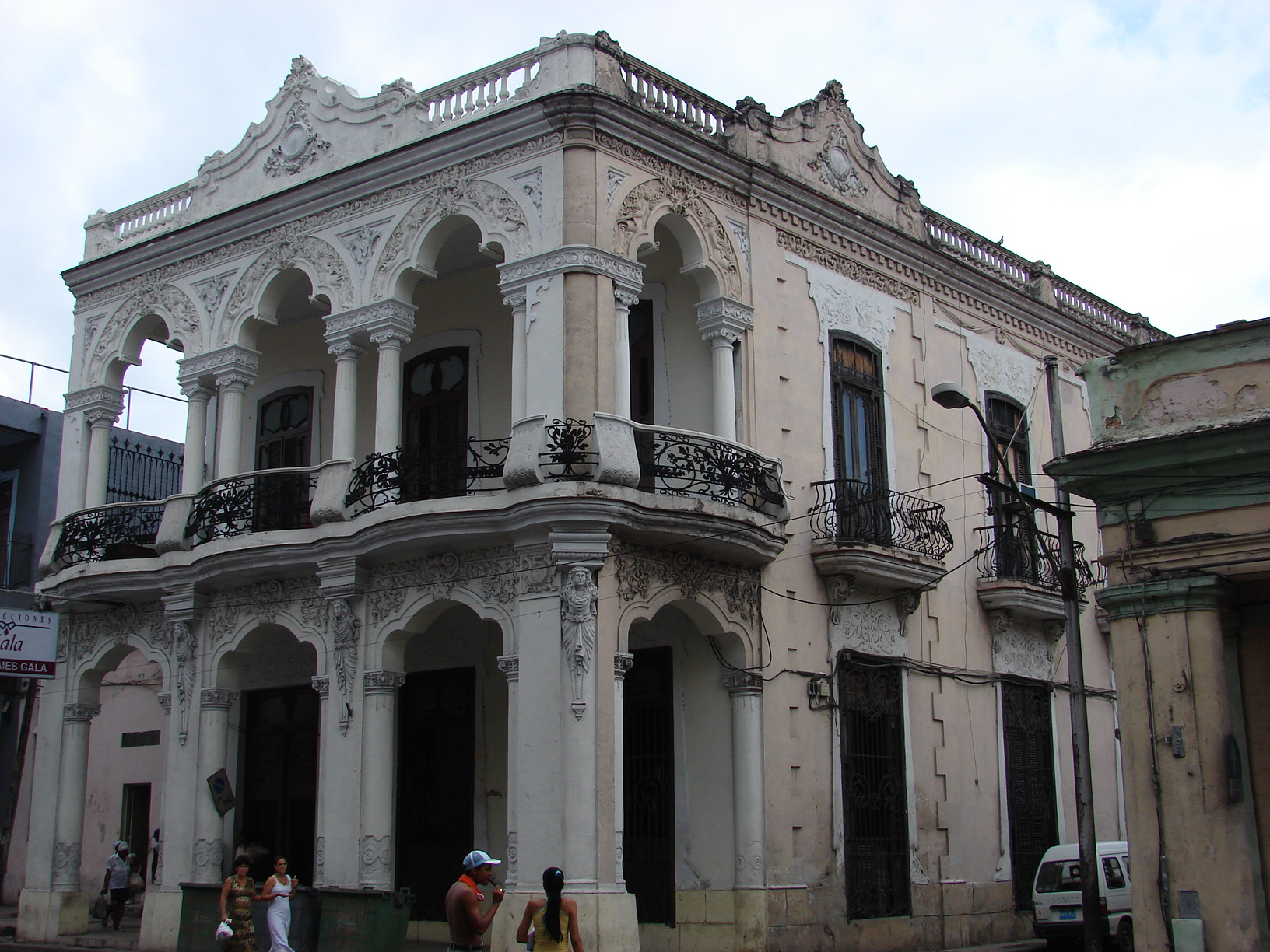
Casona of Calle Reina.

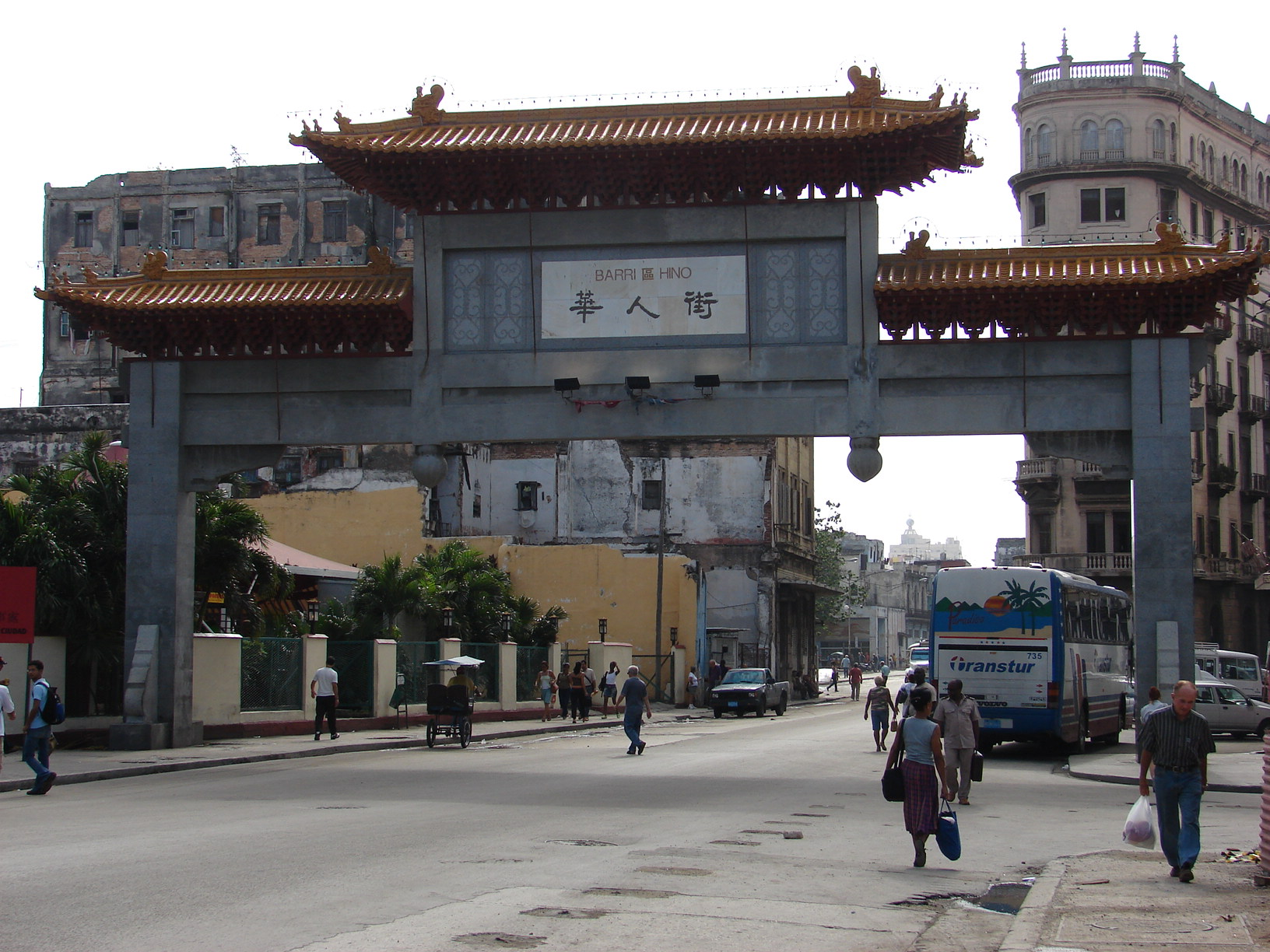
Main Gate to Chinatown.
