= Salvador González Escalona =

Cuban artist (1948–2021

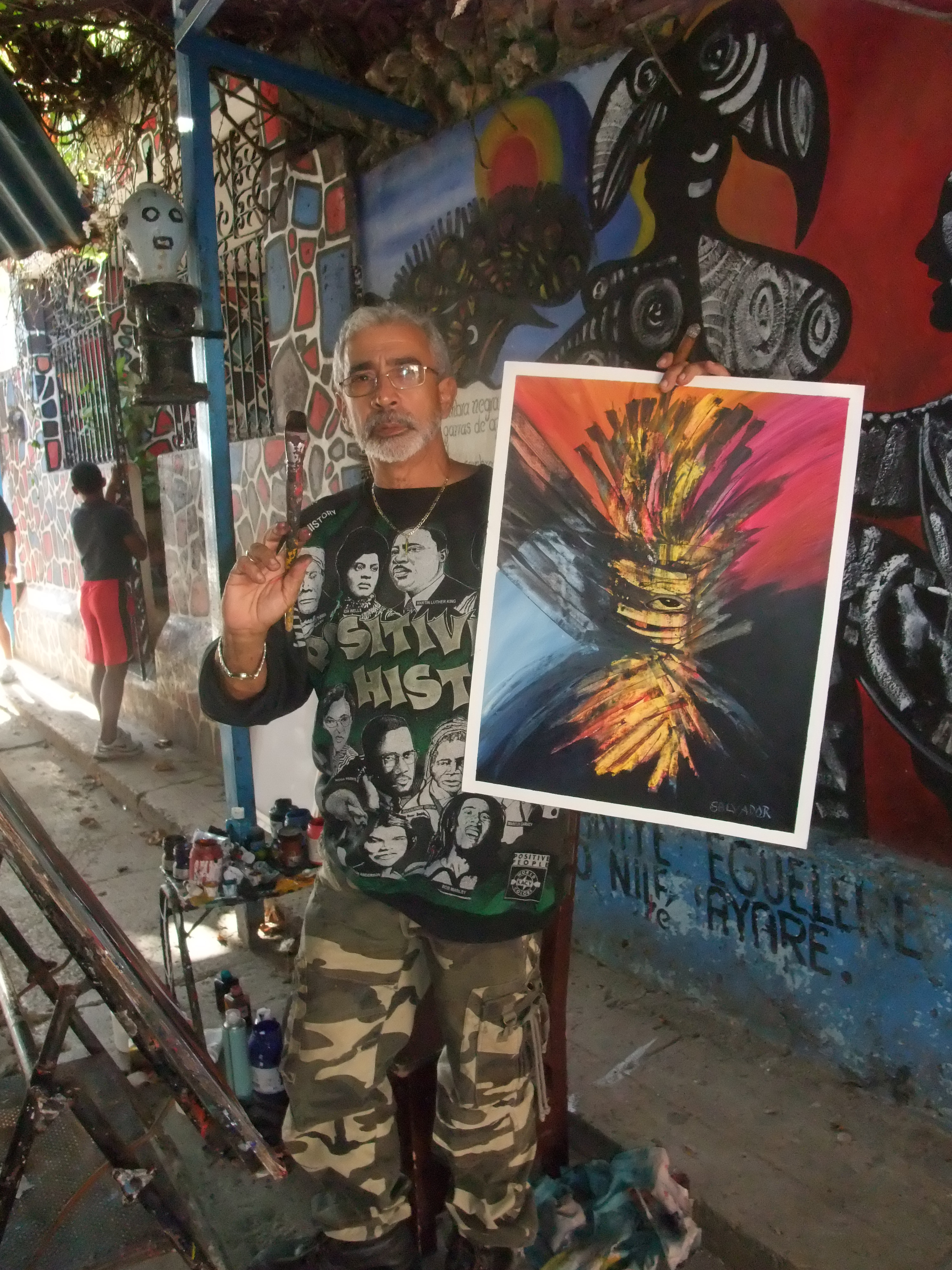
Escalona at work in "Callejón de Hamel" with his painting Makuto (2008)

Salvador González Escalona (October 21, 1948 – April 16, 2021) was a Cuban painter, muralist and sculptor. His artist name was Salvador.

His work is known as an "afro-cuban" style. He describes his work as a mix of surrealism, cubism and abstract art.

== Life ==
Escalona was born on October 21, 1948, in Camagüey. He had no formal art education, but as early as in 1968 he had his first art exhibition "Arte Popular Cubano" in "Museo de Artes Decorativas", Havana.

In the 1980s, he had a series of art exhibitions at Cuba. In 1986 he had an exhibition at Seychelles and in 1987 an exhibition in Rome, Italy.

Escalona died on April 16, 2021, in Havana.

== Callejón de Hamel ==
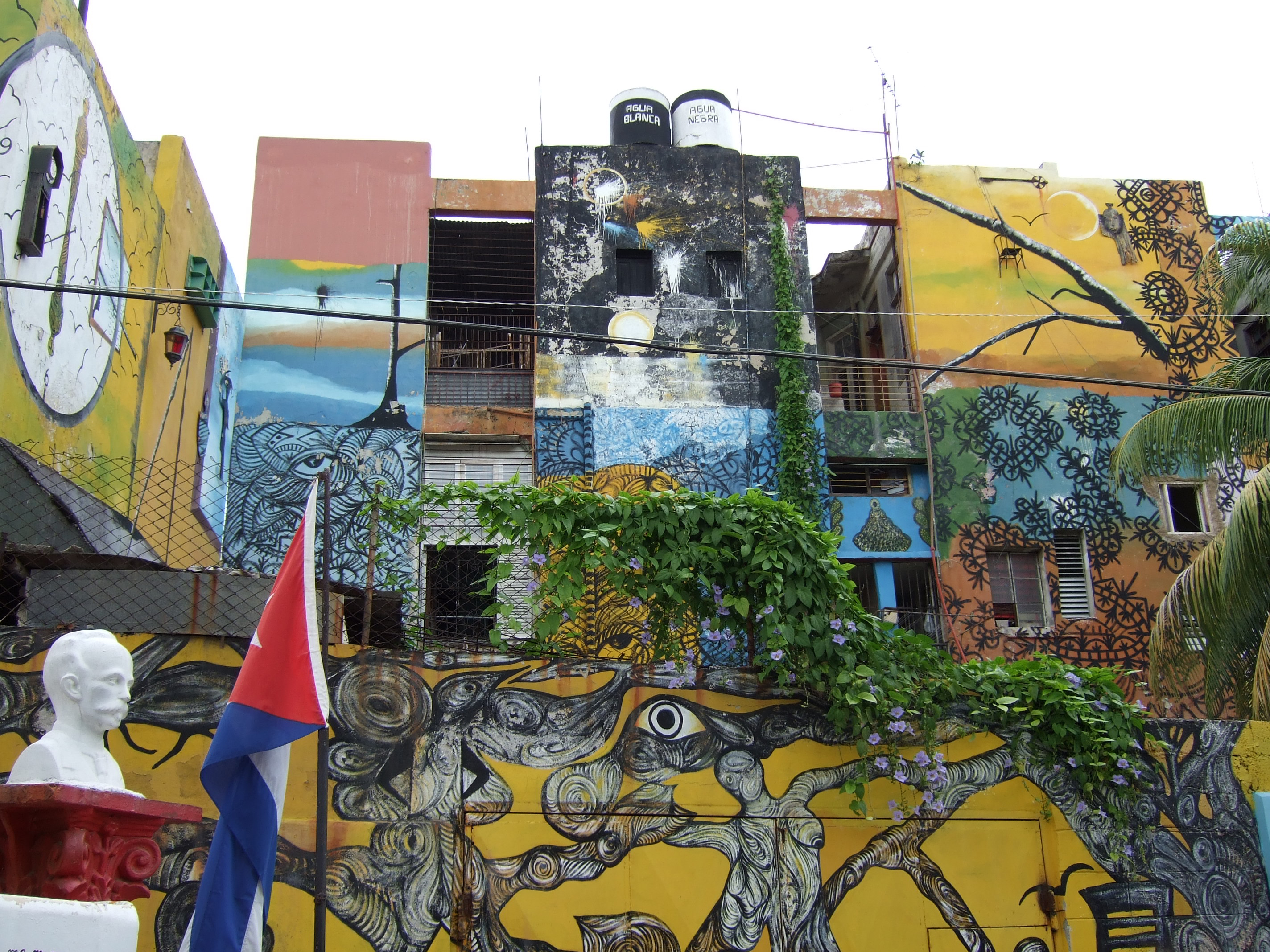
Detail from Callejón de Hamel

On April 21, 1990, Escalona started with murals and sculptures in the alleyway Callejón de Hamel, near University of Havana. For sculptures he used scrap objects like bathtubs, hand pumps, pinwheels etc., and for the murals he used different kind of available paint, including car enamel.

Even though the first four years became difficult, he was inspired by local inhabitants and visitors to continue his work, and little by little, the street was transformed from a slum area to an enthusiastic Afro-Cuban centre.

Today there are workshops for young Cuban children to learn painting. Every Sunday there are rumba performances, and every Friday Cuban music in the street. Callejón de Hamel is still Escalona's artistic headquarter.

== Later exhibitions ==
From 1990 he is represented at various exhibitions at Cuba. From 1992 he had several exhibitions abroad:

- 1992 – Stavanger + Bergen (University of Bergen) + Florø, Norway
- 1992 – Aarhus + Copenhagen, Denmark
- 1994 – Mexico
- 1994 – Randers, Denmark
- 1996 – Vejle, Denmark
- 1997 - San Juan, Puerto Rico
- 1998 - New York City (The Metropolitan Pavilion Gallery) + University of California, Los Angeles, United States
- 1999 - New York (Manhattan), United States
- 2000 - New York (The Metropolitan Pavilion Gallery) + Tiberino + Philadelphia, United States
- 2005 – Madrid, Spain

== Murals ==
Besides several murals at Cuba, he has done murals abroad:

- 1991 – "El Hijo del Sol", 350 m^{2} – Hotel Caracas Hilton, Venezuela
- 1992 – Florø, Norway
- 1993 – "Ancestros" - Centro Multicultural, Xochimilco. Invited by Dr. Fèlix Zurita Ochoa, Mexico
- 1994 – "Sol de America" - Museo Antropologico de Querétaro, Institudo Indigenista Otomi, Universidad Autonomica, Querétaro, Mexico
- 1995 – "Madre Agua", "Solidaritetshuset", Copenhagen, Denmark
- 1995 – "La Roca del Amor" – The Johnson State College, Vermont + a mural in Arizona, United States
- 1996 – "Deidales del Mar" – Vejle, Denmark
- 1996 – "El muerto pare el Santo" + "Iku Lobi Osha" – California + "La creacion de Obbatala ante el dios del Camino" – New Jersey (Roosevelt elementary school) + "El dios del Camino" – New York (Washington Square Preschool), United States
- 1996 – Hospitality center, Alburquerque, United States
- 1998 – "El framboyan" – New York (El Museo del Barrio), United States
- 1998 – "Orilla frente al Mar" + "Rumba" + "Rumba en la Rumba" + "De un solo pajaro las dos alas", Puerto Rico
- 2000 – "Mariposas del Caribe" – Philadelphia, United States
- 2001 – "Una Flor para Africa" – Philadelphia, United States
- 2007 – Turin, Italy

== Sculptures ==
Besides several sculptures at Cuba:

- 1994 – "La ganga y la Llave" – Randers, Denmark
- 1996 – "Yemaya Olokun" – Vejle, Denmark

== Movies ==
Several video-interviews is produced by Cuban TV and by others. 2002 the 79 minutes documentary "A Cuban Legend: The Story of Salvador González" was produced by Bette Wanderman.
