= Castillo del Príncipe (Havana) =

Military fort in Cuba

El Castillo del Principe
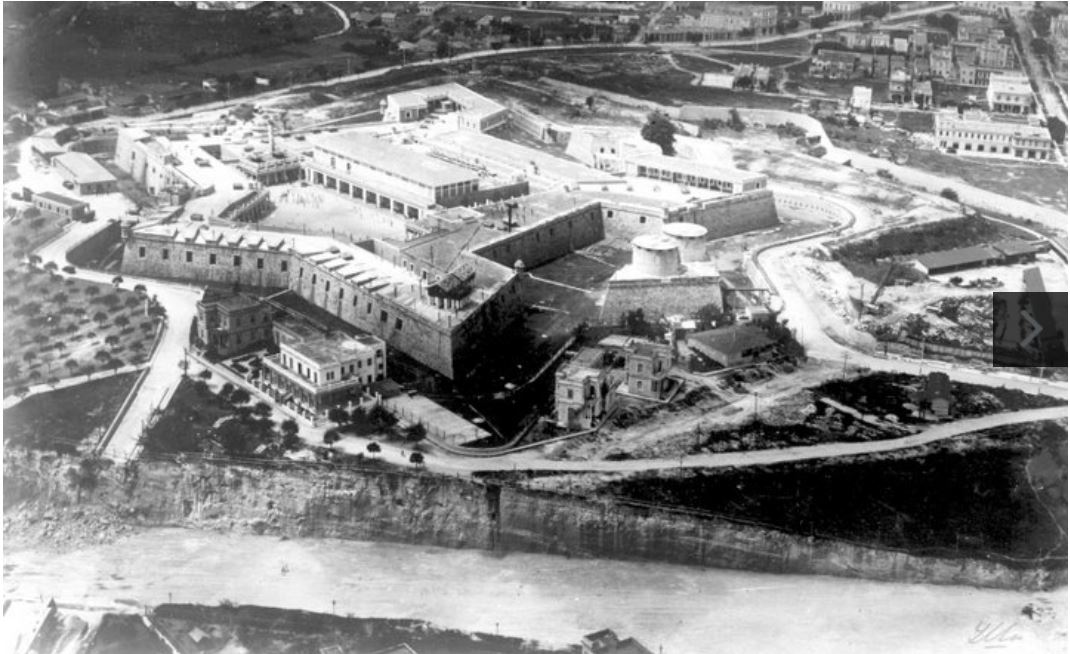
- Castillo del Principe in 1945.
- Interactive map of the El Castillo del Principe area

General information
- Coordinates: 23.131°N 82.386°W
- Groundbreaking: 1767
- Completed: 1779

The Castillo del Príncipe (Castle of the Prince) is a military fort located in the Loma de Aróstegui, in Havana, Cuba. In 1982, the fort was inscribed on the UNESCO World Heritage List, along with other historic sites in Old Havana, because of the city's importance in the European conquest of the New World, its fortifications, and its unique architecture.

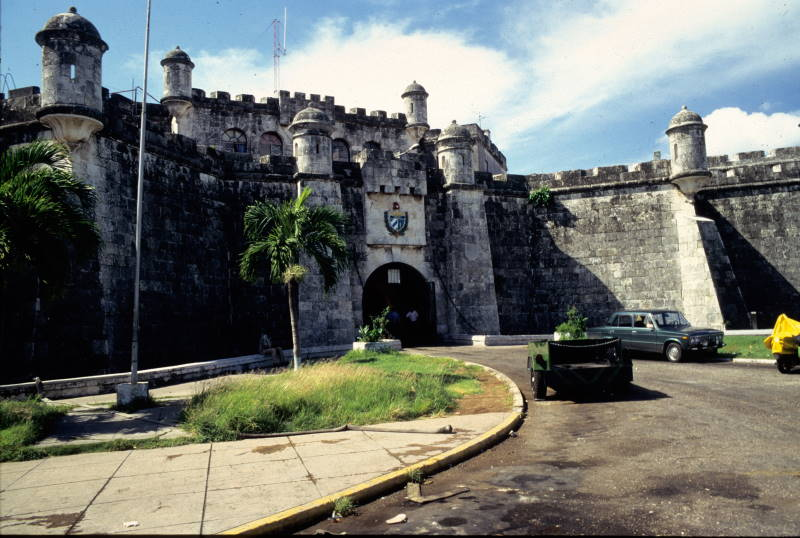
The main emblematic colonial entrance of the Castillo del Príncipe, photo taken in 1997.

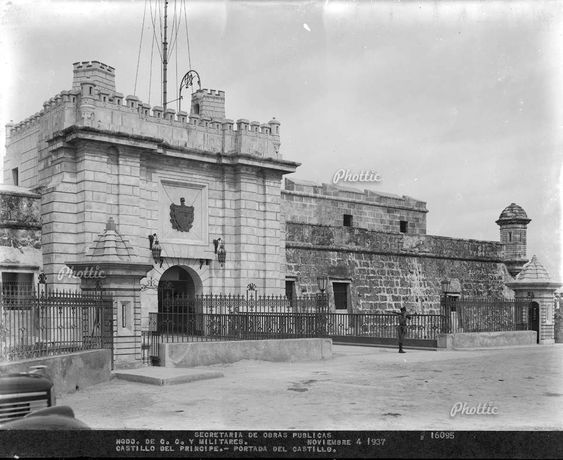
Other colonial gate of the Castillo del Príncipe, photo of 1937.

== History ==
The fort was built during the wave of military constructions in Cuba, after the end of the Capture of Havana, by the English that lasted almost a year, the Spanish government realized that the city was unprotected and transformed the "Key of the New World", into the most fortified city of the American continent.

The castle owes its name to Charles of Bourbon, Prince of Asturias, son and future successor of King Charles III of Spain. The construction was in charge of the colonel of engineers the Navarrese Silvestre Abarca y Aznar, the same one who built the Fortress of San Carlos de La Cabaña in the bay.

The works began in 1767 and concluded in 1779, although since 1771, the place had already been fortified, while the rest of the works of the military complex were finished.

The fortification had different uses, among them that of prison, a function it performed from colonial times until the Cuban Revolution, the castle became the most important in Havana. The fort continued to be a prison until the 1970s of the 20th century. Then the government transforms it into a unit of military ceremonies.

It housed common and political prisoners, including José Martí's teacher, Rafael María de Mendive. Julio Antonio Mella, Eduardo Chibás, Raúl Roa, Juan Marinello and many other prominent revolutionaries were also imprisoned.

== Structure ==
La Habana (Cuba). Castillo de El Príncipe. Plan of 1823, currently located in the General Military Archive of Madrid.

The castle has the shape of an irregular pentagon and has two bastions, two semi-bastions and a redan (V-shaped protrusion), and also contains deep trenches, mine galleries, warehouses, offices, a water cistern and a housing area large enough to accommodate a garrison of 1000 soldiers. It's stationed artillery consisted of 60 cannons of various calibers. It also has a system of tunnels built with red bricks that allow communication with all the outposts and most remote positions of the castle.

The position of Castillo del Príncipe allowed a broad view of the city, to the remains of the old city wall, from Campus Martius.

The fort overlooked Avenue Carlos III (today officially called Avenue Salvador Allende), which led to the house of rest and recreation of the Captains General, called Quinta de los Molinos.

== Prison ==
The fortification had various uses including as a prison that served from colonial times until the Cuban Revolution. After the arrival of the revolutionary forces, the fort became the home of a unit of military ceremonies. The fort was primarily used by Castro's revolutionary armed forces to hold common and political prisoners. During 1961-1962 it housed surviving members of the Bay of Pigs Invasion who were ransomed on Christmas Day 1962.

== Detainees ==
The fortress housed detainees and prisoners including the teacher of José Martí, Rafael María de Mendive, Julio Antonio Mella, Eduardo Chibás, Raúl Roa García, Juan Marinello, and El Caballero de Paris.

== Gallery ==
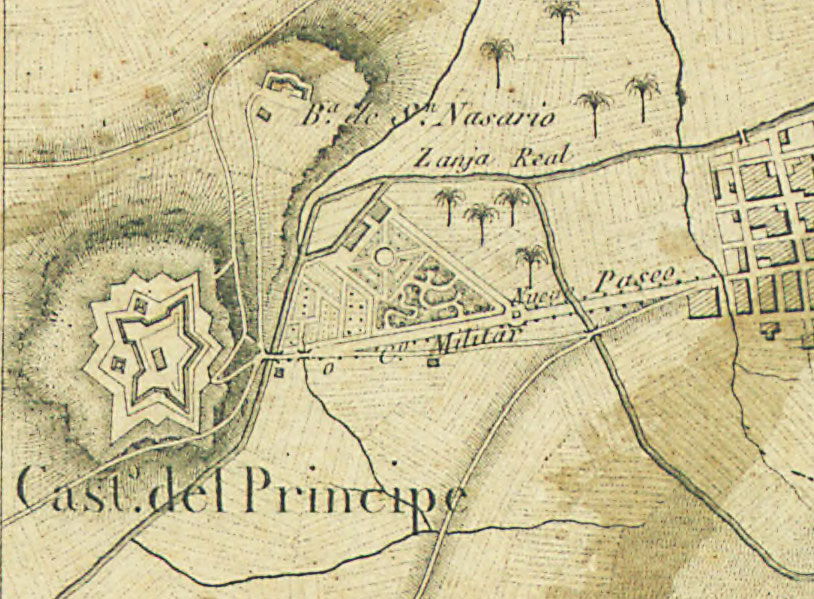
Old plan of 1841 detailing the Castillo del Príncipe and Quinta de Molinos.

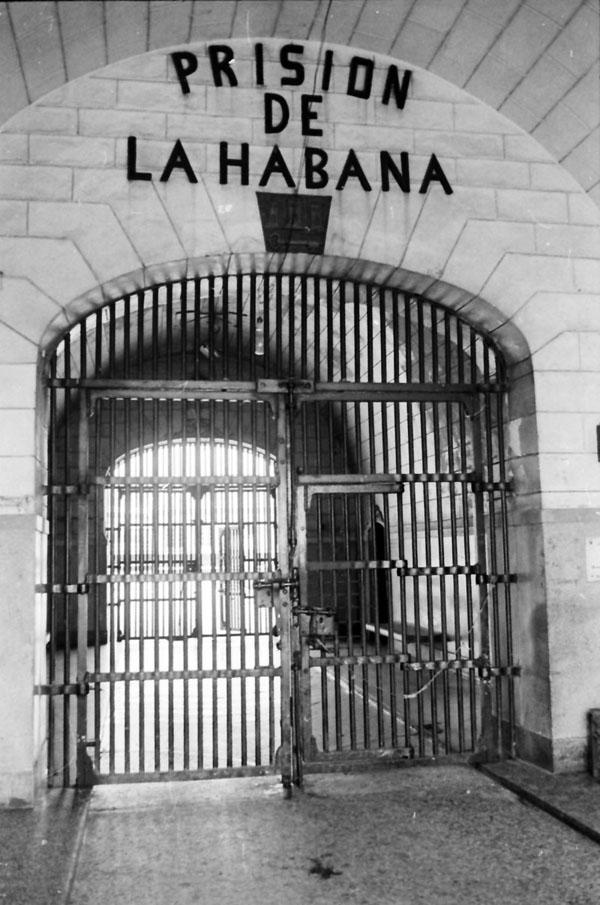
Castillo del Príncipe used as Prison of Havana in 1971.

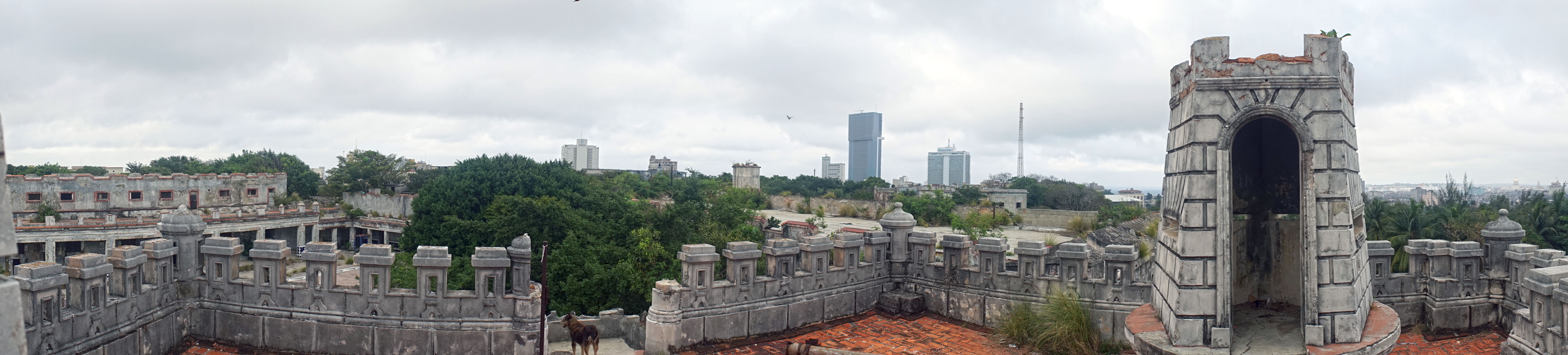
Panorama from Castillo del Príncipe.

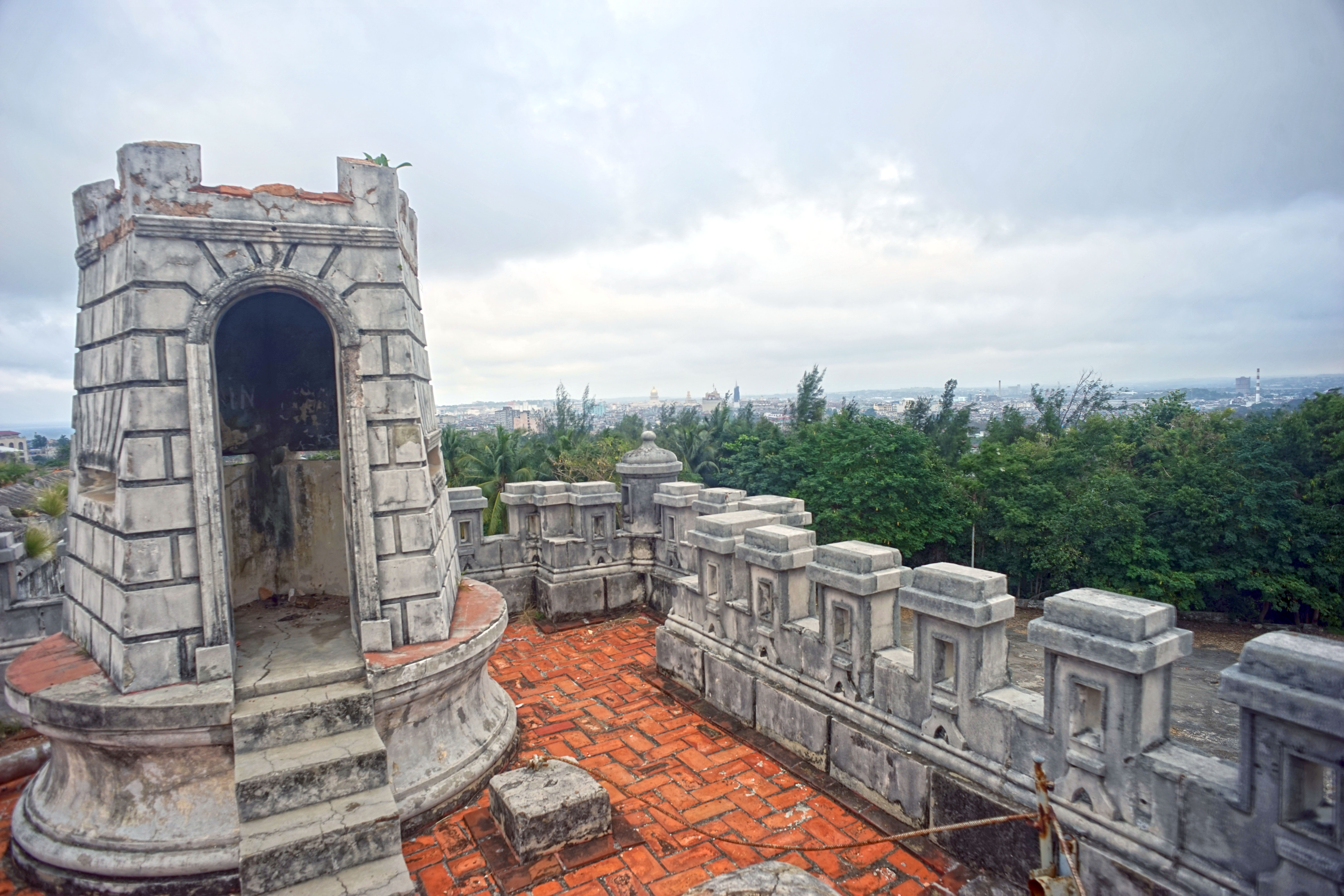
Castillo del Príncipe Pillbox.

== See also ==
- Campo de Marte, Havana
- Plaza del Vapor, Havana
- Palacio de Aldama
- Barrio de San Lázaro, Havana

== Bibliography ==
The Bay of Pigs: The Leaders' Story of Brigade 2506 (9780393331202): Johnson, Haynes: Books
