= Instituto de Historia de Cuba =

Cuban research institute and archive

The Instituto de Historia de Cuba in Havana, Cuba, is a research institute, archive, and library of late 19th and 20th century Cuban history. It was established in 1987 under the Central Committee of the Communist Party of Cuba. It is located in the Palacio de Aldama near the Parque de la Fraternidad in Havana. Among its collections are records related to Sergio Carbó y Morera and Ramón Grau. Staff of the institute have included Oscar Zanetti, among others. According to its website, research focuses on topics such as Cuban economics, politics, society, regional history, and international relations.

== See also ==
- Bay of Pigs: 40 Years After (conference), co-sponsored by the institute in 2001

== Bibliography ==
- Vanessa Oliveira; Xavier Calmettes, eds. (2016). "Guide du chercheur américaniste: Enquête de terrain et travail de recherche à Cuba" [Americanist Researcher's Guide: Survey of Cuba]. Nuevo Mundo, Mundos Nuevos (in French). ISSN 1626-0252. "Archives: Instituto de Historia de Cuba"
