= Plaza del Vapor, Havana =

- Mercado de Tacon
- Plaza del Vapor, corner of Calles Galiano and Reina.
- Alternative names: Mercado Tacón

General information
- Type: Courtyard
- Architectural style: Neoclassical
- Location: Calles Galiano and Reina, Havana, Cuba
- Coordinates: 23.132975°N 82.362409°W
- Estimated completion: 1835
- Renovated: 1874
- Demolished: 1959
- Owner: Revolutionary government without authority demolished the Plaza. (Note: This theft of private property led the U.S. into severing diplomatic relations in 1961 and installing the trade embargo and various sanctions against Cuba. "Thousands of Americans and Cuban citizens suffered humiliation and financial distresses of having their private property stolen from them, some of them at gunpoint. Today there has been no justice for their claims.")

Height
- Top floor: 9.65 metres (31.7 ft)

Technical details
- Structural system: Steel & masonry
- Material: Masonry
- Size: 84 metres (276 ft) x 123 metres (404 ft)
- Floor count: 3
- Grounds: 10,345.1 square metres (111,354 sq ft)

Design and construction
- Architects: Rayneri and Sorrentino
- Developer: Francisco Martí
- Known for: Central market

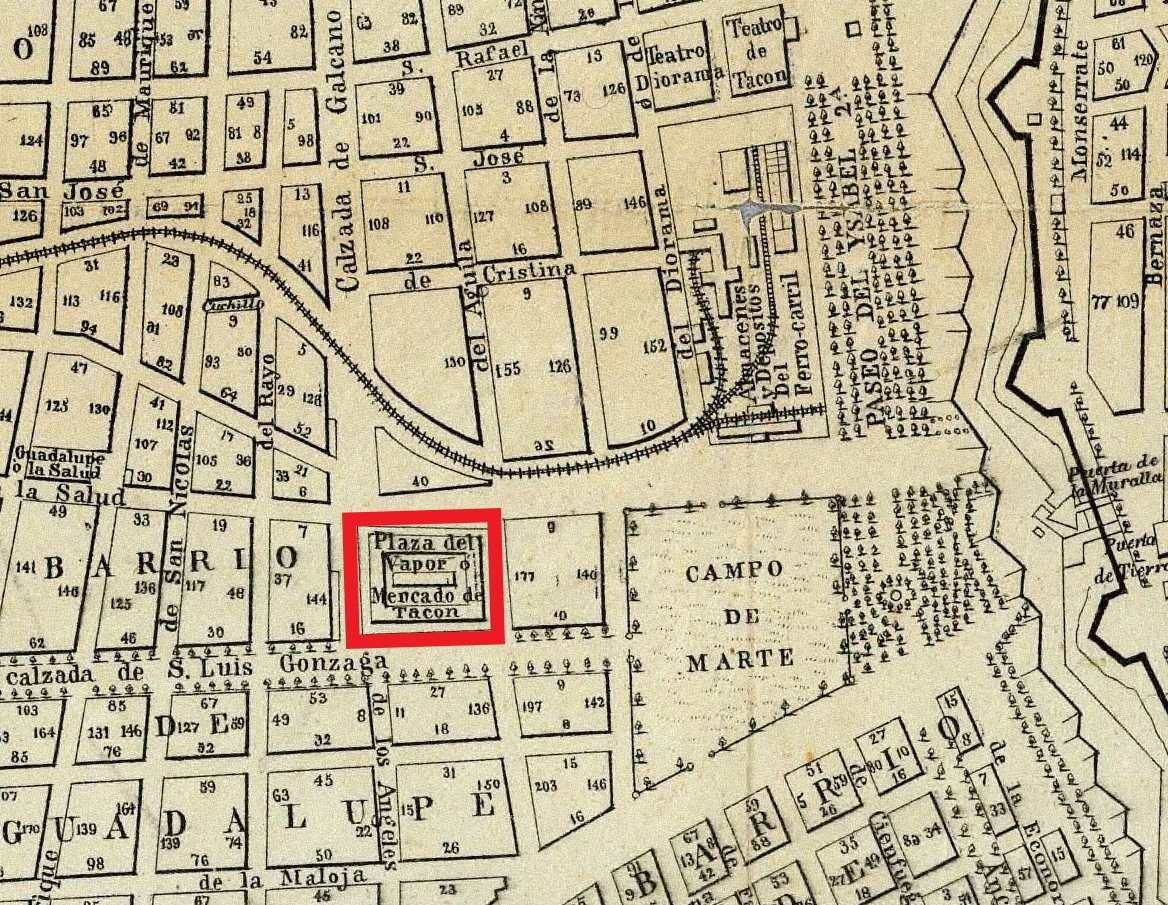
Plaza del Vapor 1853 Havana map.

The Plaza del Vapor was a covered market in Havana, it was completed in 1835. Its name derives from its builder Francisco Martí who became later the impresario of the Tacón Theatre and who had a monopoly of fish trade in the city. Martí had a painting placed against a wall from a bar of the ship El Neptuno, the first vapor (steam ship) that made regular round trips between Havana and Matanzas. "It was the image of that ship that ended up naming the building." From the Plaza del Vapor, Martí sold 50% of all the lottery tickets in Cuba.

== History ==
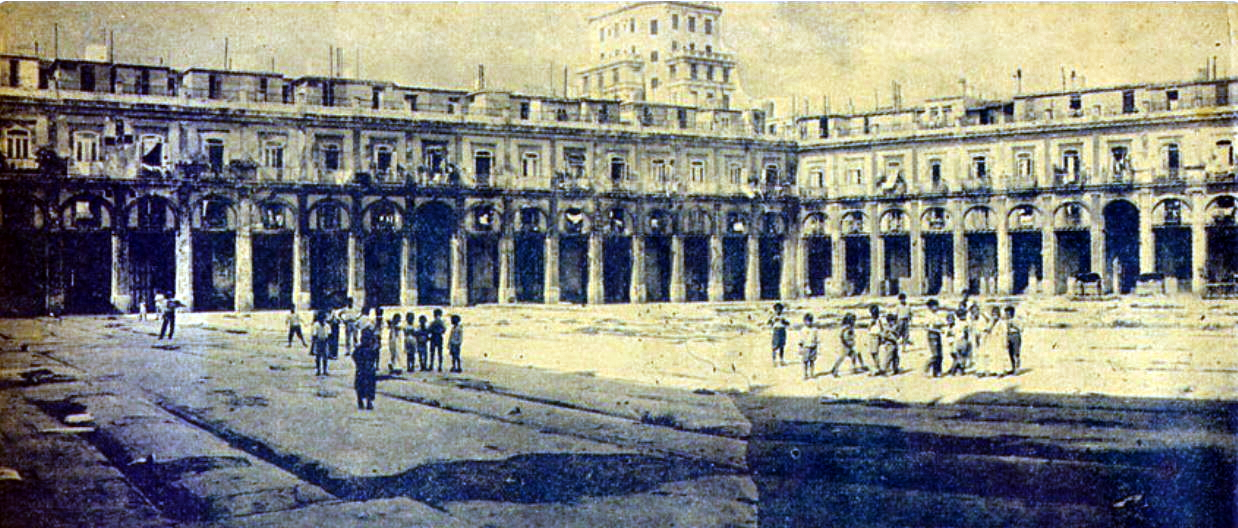
Central courtyard. Leonardo Morales y Pedroso's Cuban Telephone Co. building in the background.

In the early morning of September 7, 1872 a fire destroyed the previous mercado de Tacón and it was necessary to install a provisional market in the Campo de Marte. The Public Works Advisory Board met on April 29, 1874, and the decision was made to replace the old market in the same place with the name Plaza de Tacón. The fruit stalls, the little shops, the clothing stores, the fur shops and a thousand other establishments that adorned the street gave each side of the building its particular character. With some exceptions, the shopkeepers invented new ways to attract customers, otherwise nothing remarkable happened in the Plaza de Vapor during the working hours; as the night fell, one found the animation of the city, the electric lights, the silence on the interior courtyard and the darkness.

Andrés Stanislas Romay writes about the Plaza del Vapor:

"Meanwhile the animation reigns in the inner enclosure of the square, that as by charm you see transformed into a kind of fair. If you do not want to be a philosopher, the diversity of physiognomy, costumes, conversations, will serve as a distraction, or you will contemplate with satisfaction the golden pineapple, the purple mangoes, the velvety caimito and other thousand rich fruits of the tropical fields. But behold, this agitation gradually subsides, the concurrence disappears and with it the square is almost deserted. Do you think that this building is then totally destitute of interest? No,: it is then transformed into a temple of love, of that subtle spirit that penetrates whenever man puts his mark and who does not disdain to visit the darkest shelter at the same time as the most majestic palace?

== Chinatown ==
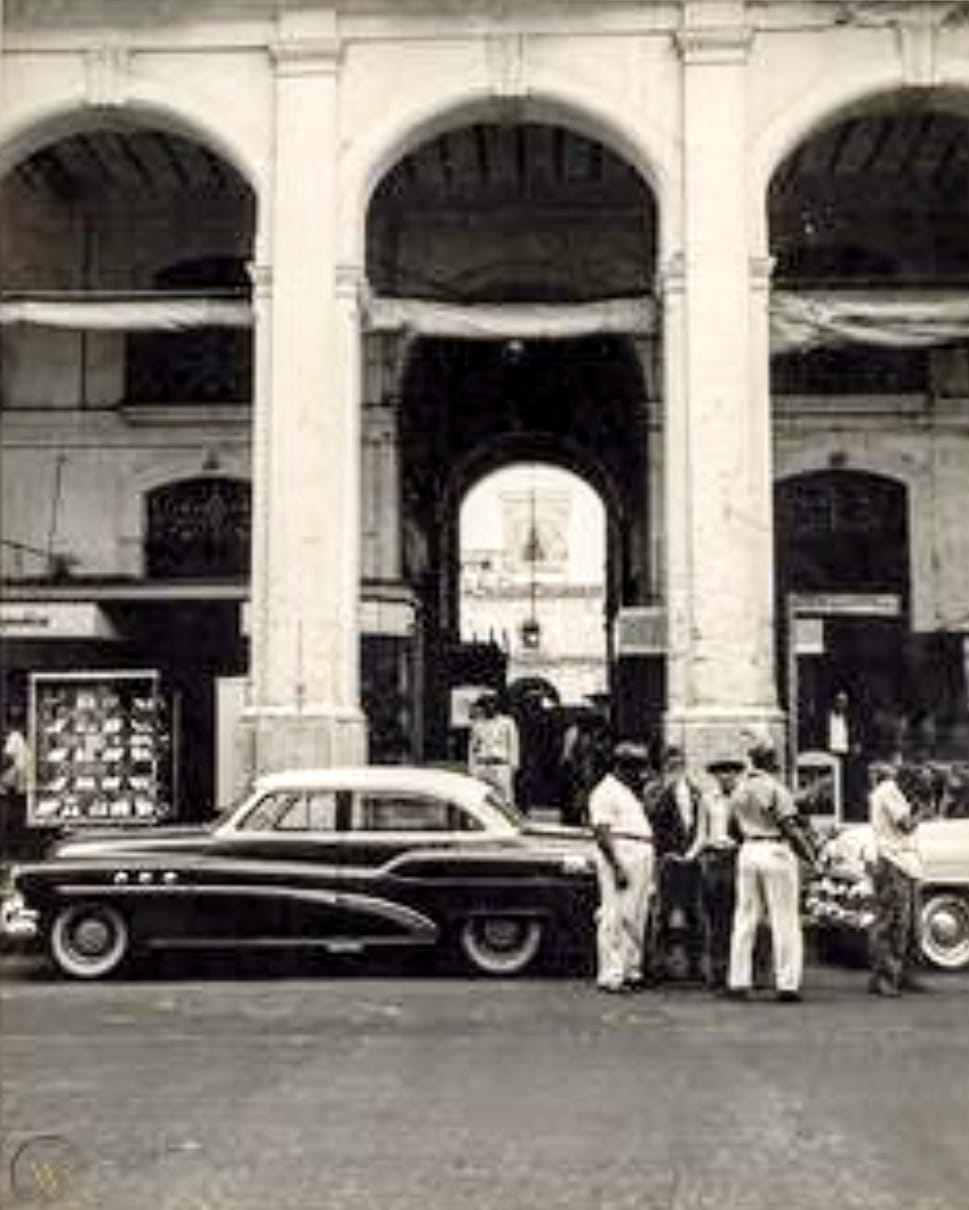
Plaza de Vapor_entrance calle Dragones, Havana, Cuba

El Barrio Chino was Havana's Chinatown, located in the area of the Plaza de Vapor. It was once Latin America's largest Chinese community, incorporated into the city by the early part of the 20th century. Hundreds of thousands of Chinese workers were brought in by Spanish settlers from Guangdong, Fujian, Hong Kong, and Macau via Manila, Philippines starting in the mid-19th century to replace or work alongside African slaves. After completing 8-year contracts, many Chinese immigrants settled permanently in Havana.

The first 206 Chinese-born arrived in Havana on June 3, 1847. The neighborhood was booming with Chinese restaurants, laundries, banks, pharmacies, theaters and several Chinese-language newspapers, the neighborhood comprised 44 square blocks during its prime. The heart of the Barrio Chino was the Plaza del Vapor on el Cuchillo de Zanja (Zanja Canal). The strip was a pedestrian-only street adorned with lanterns, red paper dragons and other Chinese cultural items; there were a great number of authentic Cuban-Chinese restaurants.

Some 5,000 immigrants from the U.S. came to Cuba during the late 19th century to escape the discrimination present at the time. Another, albeit smaller wave of Chinese immigrants, also arrived during the 20th century, some as supporters of the communist cause during the Cuban revolution and others as dissidents escaping the authorities in China.

There were almost no women among the nearly entirely male Chinese coolie population that migrated to Cuba(1%). In Cuba some Indian (Native American), mulatto, black and white women engaged in carnal relations or marriages with Chinese men, with marriages of mulatto, black and white women being reported by the Cuba Commission Report.

120,000 Cantonese 'coolies' (all males) entered Cuba under contract for 8 years. Most of these men did not marry, but Hung Hui (1975:80) cites there was a frequency of sexual activity between black women and these Asian immigrants. According to Osberg (1965:69) the free Chinese practice of buying slave women and then freeing them expressly for marriage was utilized at length. In the nineteenth and twentieth centuries, Chinese men (Cantonese) engaged in sexual activity with black Cuban women, and from such relations many children were born.

In the 1920s, an additional 30,000 Cantonese and small groups of Japanese also arrived; both immigrations were exclusively male and there was rapid intermarriage with white, black and mulato populations. CIA World Factbook. Cuba. 2008. May 15, 2008. claimed 114,240 Chinese-Cuban coolies with only 300 pure Chinese.

In the study of genetic origin, admixture and asymmetry in maternal and paternal human lineages in Cuba, thirty-five Y-chromosome SNPs were typed in the 132 male individuals of the Cuban sample. The study does not include any people with some Chinese ancestry. All the samples were white Cubans and black Cubans. Two out of 132 male samples belong to East Asian Haplogroup O2 which is found in significant frequencies among Cantonese people is found in 1.5% of Cuban population. In the 1920s, an additional 30,000 Chinese arrived; the immigrants were exclusively male. In 1980, 4000 Chinese lived there, but by 2002, only 300 pure Chinese were left.

Barrio Chino paifang. Calles Dragones and Zanja. Leonardo Morales y Pedroso's Cuban Telephone Co. building in the background.

Two thousand Chinese, consisting of Cantonese and Hakkas, fought with the rebels in Cuba's Ten Years' War, and a monument in Havana honours the Cuban Chinese who fell in the war on which is inscribed: "There was not one Cuban Chinese deserter, not one Cuban Chinese traitor." Chinese Cubans, including some Chinese-Americans from California, joined the Spanish–American War in 1898 to achieve independence from Spain, but a few Chinese, who were loyal to Spain, left Cuba and went to Spain. Racial acceptance and assimilation would come later.

The district has two paifang, the larger one located on Calle Dragones. The long-neglected Chinatown in Havana, Cuba, received materials for its paifang from the People's Republic of China as part of the Chinatown's gradual renaissance. China donated the materials in the late 1990s. It has a well defined written welcoming sign in Chinese and Spanish. The smaller arch is located on Zanja strip. Cuba's Chinese boom ended when Fidel Castro's 1959 revolution seized private businesses, sending tens of thousands of business-minded Chinese fleeing, mainly to the United States. Descendants are now making efforts to preserve and revive the culture. Many of the businesses in the Plaza del Vapor were operated and owned by Chinese Cubans.

The Chinese Cubans fought in the Cuban war of independence on the side of those seeking independence from Spain. A memorial consisting of a broken column memorializes Chinese participation in the war of independence at the corners of L and Linea in Havana. While many fled, some Chinese stayed after the start of Fidel Castro's rule in 1961. Younger generations are working in a wider variety of jobs than the previous generation. Many are entering show-business as song composers, actors, actresses, singers, and models.

=== Shanghai Theatre ===
Was a few blocks from the Plaza del Vapor, on Calle Zanja at # 205 (W-9497). (Note: "A good Havana burlesque will stay out of the red as easily as a bad one, and we feel that nothing is too good for our customers. When they come expecting to see an artistic performance, we will give it to them.") "Located in Chinatown, the old, hot and uncomfortable Shanghai Theater has the only public burlesque in Havana. Girls strip completely (no G-strings). This theater is probably one of the few places in the world which openly shows pornographic movies. Admission is $1.25, but varies according to the location of the seats..."

== Vapor ==
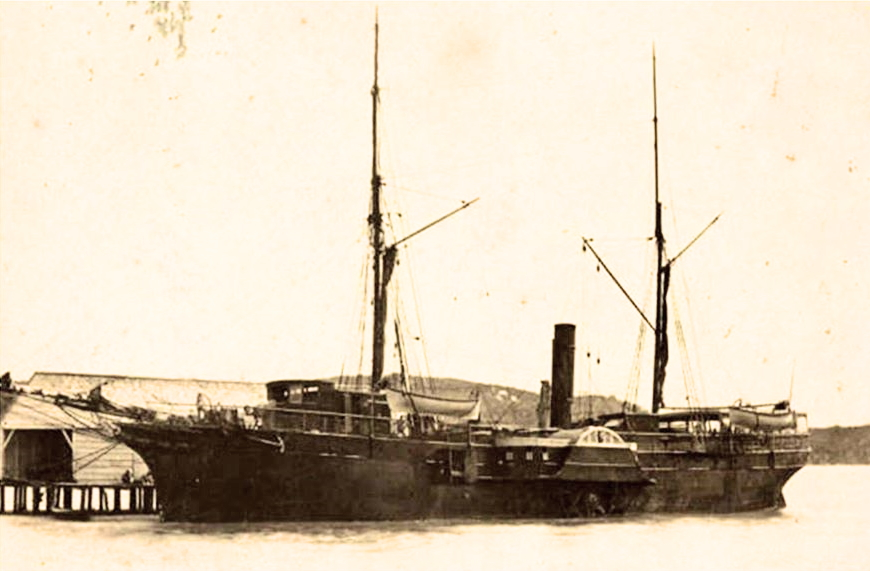
The steamship Neptuno, for which the Plaza "del Vapor" was named

A weekly service between Havana and Matanzas by the steamship the "Neptune" began its service on July 18, 1819, leaving Havana on Wednesdays at six in the morning for Matanzas and returning on Sundays at the same time, and carrying correspondence, cargo and passengers. The Plaza de Tacón, which was subsequently known as “del Vapor”, received this last name because “Pancho” Martí, owner of the first existing restaurants located in the corner of Galiano and Dragones, placed a painting on the wall that represented the steamship “Neptune”, baptizing and connecting forever the Plaza with the name "vapor," (steam).

== Architecture ==
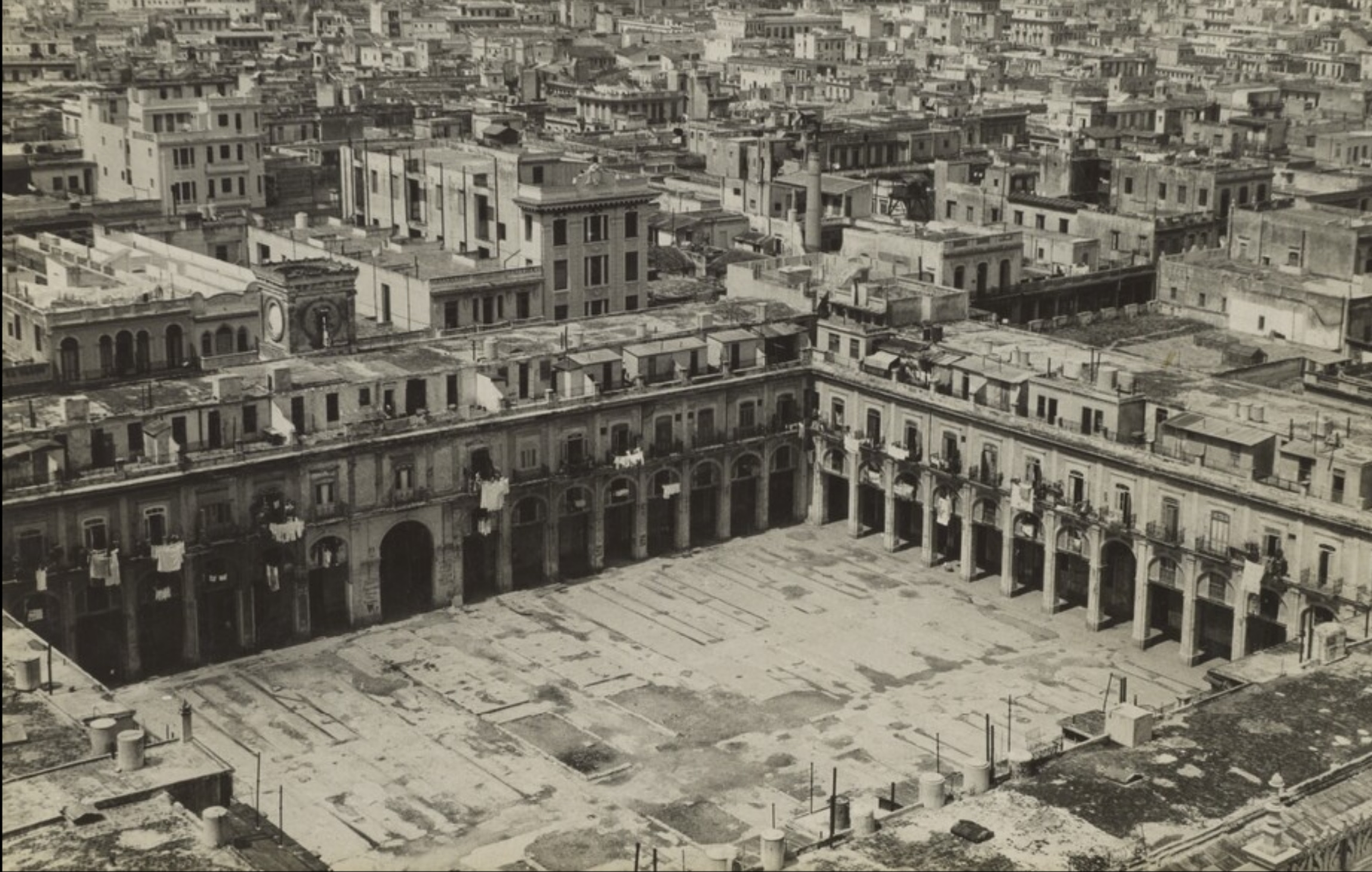
Plaza del Vapor looking towards the Southeast showing the central courtyard (1933) and the back of the central tower on calle Reina, Walker Evans.

The building site is roughly square in shape, the building had a playground-courtyard in the middle and an 8.3 metres (27 ft) high Colonnade surrounded by shops along the perimeter facing Calles Galiano, Reina, Aguila, and Dragones. The ground floor was commercial, the upper floors were occupied by the residences of some 200 families. In 1840 the building was remodeled into its characteristic colossal mass of masonry arches comprising the height of the ground and second floor. On the front of Reina Street, the architect, Eugenio Rayneri Sorrentino, designed a central, square, domed turret with a four dial clock, the entrance to the courtyard.

=== Concrete slab ===
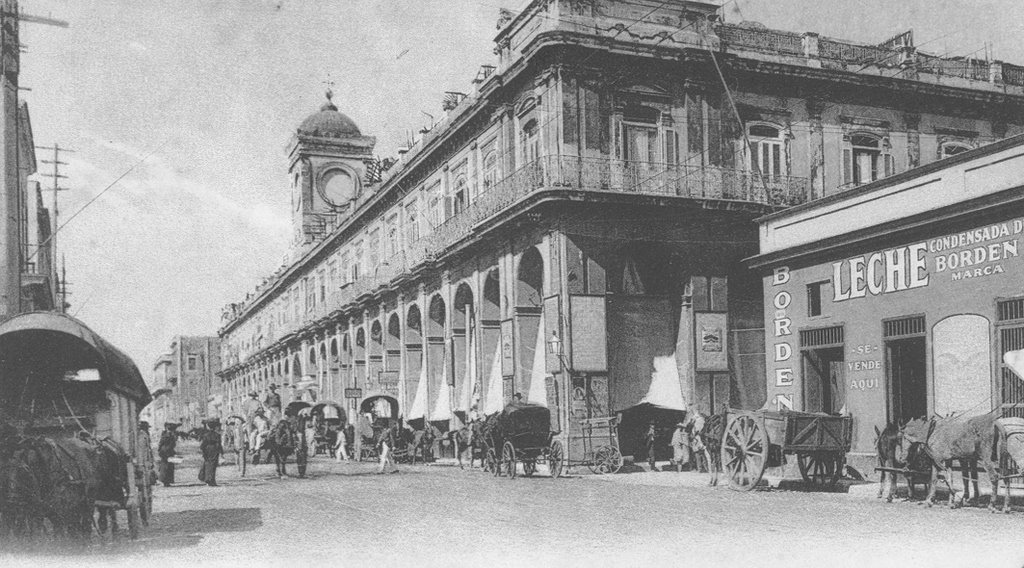
Plaza del Vapor in the late 1800s; corner of calles Reina and Aguila

In this building, Rayneri used steel beams in the ceilings spaced 70 cm apart supporting mud slabs, which were then a novelty in Havana. Unreinforced or "plain" slabs are today rare and have limited practical applications, with one exception being the mud slab. They were once common, but the economic value of reinforced ground-bearing slabs has become more appealing for many engineers. Without reinforcement, the entire load on these slabs is supported by the strength of the concrete, which becomes a vital factor. As a result, any stress induced by a load, static or dynamic, must be within the limit of the concrete's flexural strength to prevent cracking. Since unreinforced concrete is relatively very weak in tension, it is important to consider the effects of tensile stress caused by reactive soil, wind uplift, thermal expansion, and cracking. One of the most common applications for unreinforced slabs is in concrete roads. Mud slabs, also known as rat slabs, are thinner than the more common suspended or ground-bearing slabs (usually 50 to 150 mm), and usually contain no reinforcement. This makes them economical and easy to install for temporary or low-usage purposes such as subfloors, crawlspaces, pathways, paving, and levelling surfaces. In general, they may be used for any application which requires a flat, clean surface. This includes use as a base or "sub-slab" for a larger structural slab. On uneven or steep surfaces, this preparatory measure is necessary to provide a flat surface on which to install rebar and waterproofing membranes. In this application, a mud slab also prevents the plastic bar chairs from sinking into soft topsoil which can cause spalling due to incomplete coverage of the steel. Sometimes a mud slab may be a substitute for coarse aggregate. Mud slabs typically have a moderately rough surface, finished with a float.

=== Wrought iron ===
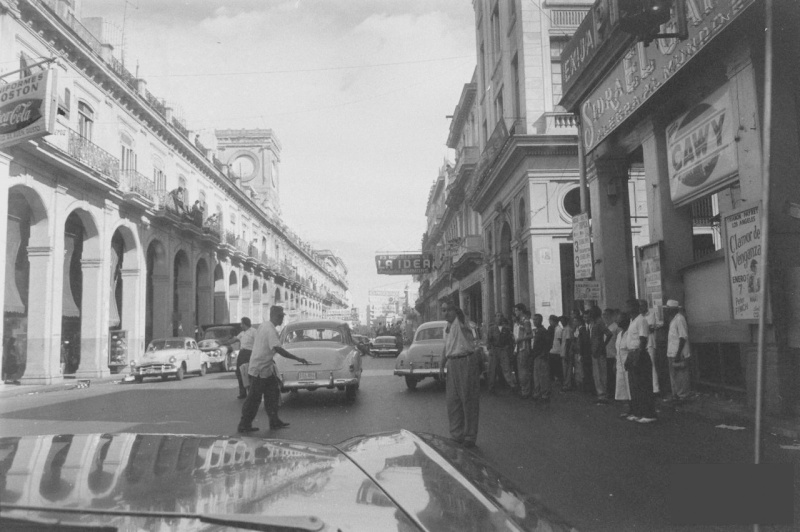
Plaza del Vapor in 1959 before it was demolished.

The main facade facing Calle Reina had a clock tower in the center of the building. Wrought iron frames at the playground and decorative railings throughout the building had the letters MT, the initials of Miguel Tacon. The railings of the balconies were later reused around the fontains in the renovation of Parque Central. The architects were notable for their design of wrought iron railings in the balconies, in the mezzanine and in the upper floor. Before the development of effective methods of steelmaking and the availability of large quantities of steel, wrought iron was the most common form of malleable iron. It was given the name wrought because it was hammered, rolled or otherwise worked while hot enough to expel molten slag. The modern functional equivalent of wrought iron is mild steel, also called low-carbon steel. Neither wrought iron nor mild steel contain enough carbon to be hardenable by heating and quenching.

Wrought iron is highly refined, with a small amount of slag forged out into fibres. It consists of around 99.4% iron by mass. The presence of slag is beneficial for blacksmithing operations, and gives the material its unique fibrous structure. The silicate filaments of the slag also protect the iron from corrosion and diminish the effect of fatigue caused by shock and vibration.

Historically, a modest amount of wrought iron was refined into steel, which was used mainly to produce swords, cutlery, chisels, axes and other edged tools as well as springs and files. The demand for wrought iron reached its peak in the 1860s, being in high demand for ironclad warships and railway use. However, as properties such as brittleness of mild steel improved with better ferrous metallurgy and as steel became less costly to make thanks to the Bessemer process and the Siemens-Martin process, the use of wrought iron declined.

Many items, before they came to be made of mild steel, were produced from wrought iron, including rivets, nails, wire, chains, rails, railway couplings, water and steam pipes, nuts, bolts, horseshoes, handrails, wagon tires, straps for timber roof trusses, and ornamental ironwork, among many other things. (Note: Some but not all of these items are mentioned in Gordon, R. B. (1996))

Wrought iron is no longer produced on a commercial scale. Many products described as wrought iron, such as guard rails, garden furniture and gates, are actually made of mild steel. They retain that description because they are made to resemble objects which in the past were wrought (worked) by hand by a blacksmith (although many decorative iron objects, including fences and gates, were often cast rather than wrought).

== Vendors ==
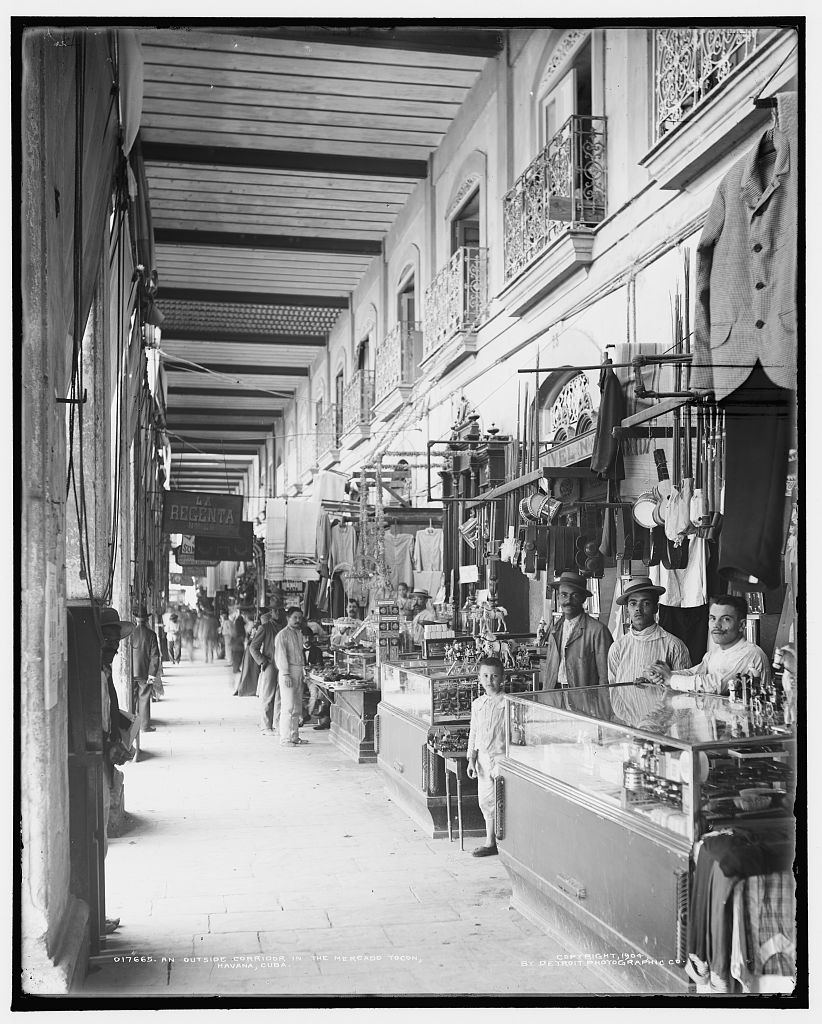
Plaza del Vapor vendors. 1904

Sergio R. San Pedro del Valle says in his book Lived Yesterday (Miami, 2008), that there were more than 160 shops that opened their doors in the Plaza del Vapor. There were more than 160 businesses in the Plaza del vapor. Carlos Rodríguez Búa writing about the nearby "El Barrio Chino" notes: "...the Plaza del Vapor occupied la manzana (the entire block) between Galiano, Reina, Dragones and Águila streets and about 1824 there were established without any order and with the most petty irregularity the vendors of daily supplies for that part new of the population, so that the best of those positions were uneven wooden blocks that belonged to different owners.

I knew the Plaza del Vapor already in its decline, at the end of the 50s and it was incredible the amount of small businesses that were piled up there. I'll talk about it again because it was located in the neighborhood of Chinatown and there were a few of them there. I used to go there every week to buy the discs with 45 revolutions per minute that on the site were obtained at a third of the official price in nightclubs (thirty-five cents against a peso and ten cents that normally cost), as well as to the bookstores of use in which you took me masterpieces for a few cents, as well as the expensive National Geographic magazines already used."

=== Lottery ===
The main, upper floor was all residential and occupied by the homes of some 200 families. The building was mostly a market for the national lottery, and sold no less than 50 percent of the tickets that were printed for the entire country. In 1947, the Ministry of Health closed the Mercado de Colón or Plaza del Polvorín, and the vendors operating in it relocated to the central courtyard of the Plaza del Vapor, putting an end to the baseball and football games that took place in this space.

== Viyaya ==
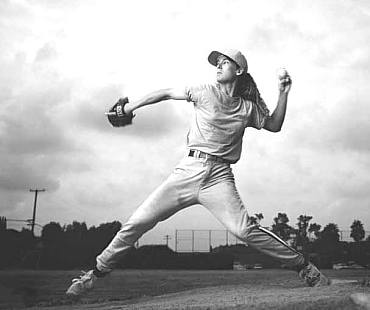
Eulalia González a.k.a. Viyaya. 1940s

Nicolás Tanco Armero writes about Viyaya a baseball player at the Plaza del Vapor; he notes that Viyaya played in baseball games that were organized in the central courtyard, they had named the team El Deportivo Tacón, a team from the neighborhood, and enjoyed enormous popularity because a female tenant from the Plaza del Vapor was part of the team: she was named Eulalia González but everyone knew as Viyaya. A girl playing baseball in Havana, and not only in the Plaza del Vapor, but in the most renowned pleasures of the Havana and even in certain localities of the interior all during the decades of the 40s and 50s. Viyaya played several positions, even was a lefty pitcher, but where she became famous was at first base. She was something to watch. Elio Menéndez, who won the national journalism award says about her: "She excelled more on defense than at bat, although she was not an out and out player. The rival pitchers had no regard for her. No pitcher saw well that a woman could hit against him and to avoid it the ball was thrown close to her body which gave rise to many verbal fights." In April 1947 the American businessman Max Carey came to Cuba with two baseball groups made up of women, and hired Viyaya to play in the USA. She went and returned shortly, to continue playing on the grounds of the Plaza del Vapor.

== El Curita ==
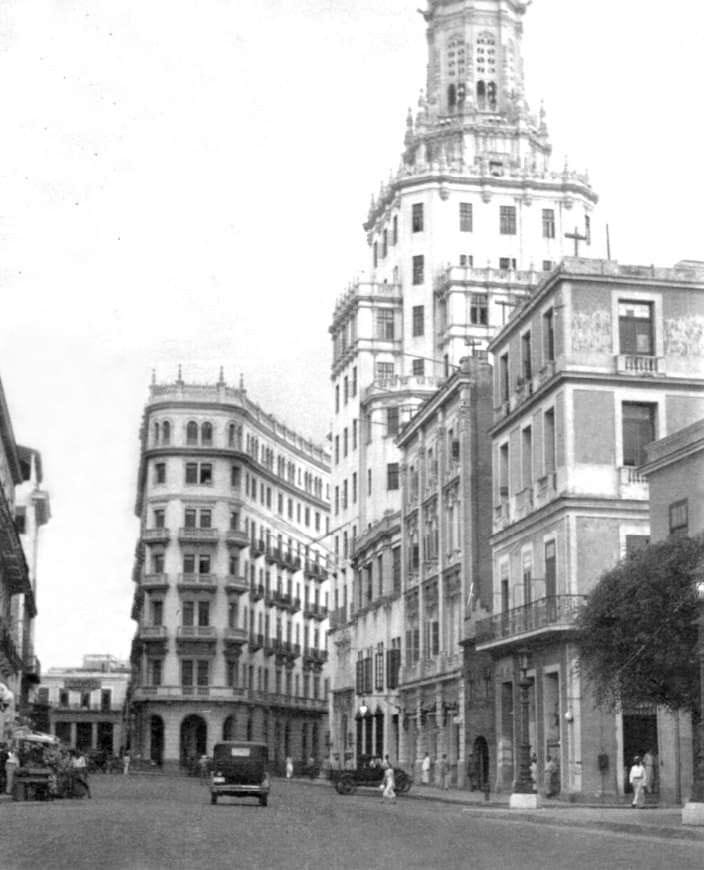
Plaza del Vapor, Cuban Telephone Company Building. Calles Águila y Dragones. Havana, Cuba. ca. 1920

The Little Priest, after whom the Parque El Curita is named, was born in Aguada de Pasajeros, in 1921, and for nine years prepared for the priesthood in the seminaries of San Basileo el Magno, in Santiago de Cuba, and San Carlos and San Ambrosio Seminary, in Havana. Everyone affectionately called him El Curita. He was imprisoned in the Castillo del Príncipe. While there, he organized a hunger strike and led a daring escape. He was responsible for the sabotage to the fuel tanks of the Belot refinery in Regla, whose black smoke, for several days, showed the people of Havana that the fight against Batista was reactivated. He was also involved with organizing the Night of the Hundred Bombs, showing that the dictatorship could no longer control the city. This was an action that was planned with great care; he demanded from the participants that the bombings could not cause victims; there were not any. The Batista forces persecuted him without. On March 11, 1958, an emissary from the Sierra Maestra, on behalf of Fidel Castro, asked El Curita to move to the Sierra Maestra mountain in order to preserve his life. He responded that his place was in Havana. On the 18th he fell into a trap in an apartment in Vedado and was taken to the Bureau of Investigation where he was brutally tortured. The next day, his corpse, sewn with bullets, appeared in Altahabana. El Curita worked in a small printing press installed in Plaza del Vapor where the first edition of La Historia Me Absolverá was secretly printed. The distribution of the pamphlet in the country, before the amnesty of the moncadistas, in 1955, contributed decisively to forge the vanguard that would lead the armed struggle against Batista.

== Demolition ==
The Plaza del Vapor met a similar fate in 1959 as the Paris food market Les Halles would meet in 1971. Unable to compete in the new market economy and in need of massive repairs, the colorful ambiance once associated with the bustling area of merchant stalls disappeared altogether when Les Halles was dismantled; the wholesale market was relocated to the suburb of Rungis. Two of the glass and cast iron market pavilions were dismantled and re-erected elsewhere; one in the Paris suburb of Nogent-sur-Marne, the other in Yokohama, Japan.

At the beginning of the 1959 Revolution Fidel Castro ordered a stop to all construction in Cuba, and to have the Plaza del Vapor demolished; the Ministry of Public Health declared the Plaza del Vapor unhealthy and its vendors were resettled on the grounds of Calle Amistad between Calles Estrella and Monte where the demolished Mars and Belona dance academy had operated for years. The National Institute of Savings and Housing (INAV) (Note: a state agency created with the objective of building houses for all Cubans who lacked them a lottery,) replaced Batista's National Lottery, which had been abolished by the Revolutionary government, and a new lottery to raise money for new construction, and directed by Pastorita Núñez who projected that a new, modern building, not unlike those that were proposed by Josep Lluís Sert a year earlier in his Havana Plan Piloto of 1955-1958 would now be built in the empty lot.

== Núñez proposal ==
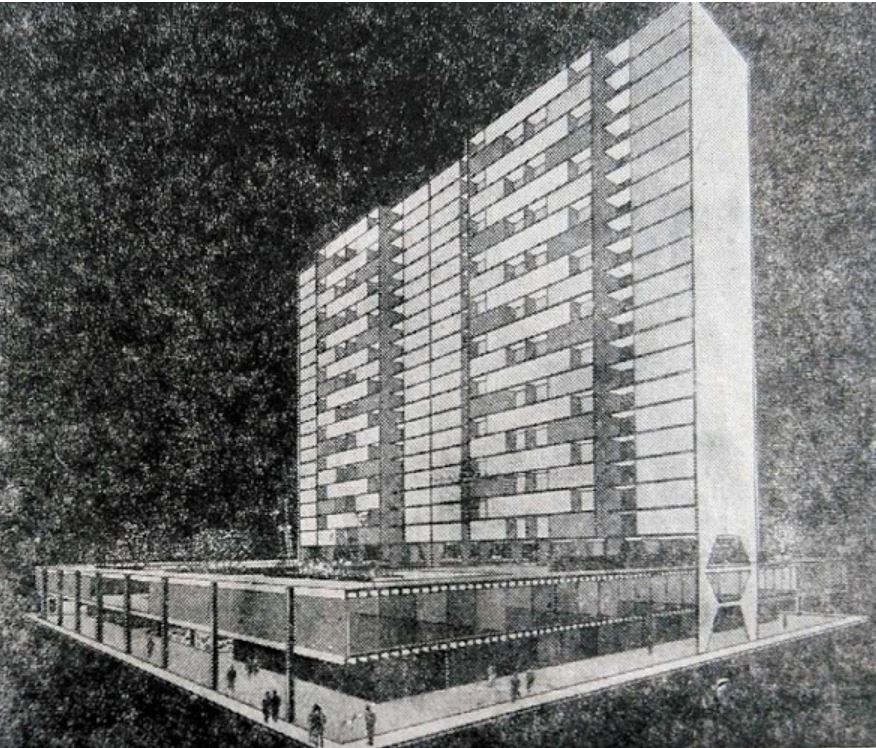
The proposed project was to replace the Plaza del Vapor, and was designed in 1959 by the architect Carlos Alfonso for the National Institute of Savings and Housing under Pastorita Núñez.

The project for a new, modern, high-rise slab building to replace the Plaza del Vapor was designed by the architect Carlos Alfonso. It consisted of a basement for parking 350 cars, a commercial ground floor, a second-floor reserved for the additional parking of 250 cars, and on top, a public, recreational area; there were 20 levels of 10 apartments each. Shortly after the work began, Pastorita Núñez' National Institute of Savings and Housing, and the National Planning Board abandoned the project, and instead proposed a park that was baptized with the name Parque del Curita; the park exists in that location to this day. (Note: it has been said the real objective of razing the Plaza del Vapor was an attempt to erase the republican history of the area.) Although some newspapers of the time wrote at the end of 1959 that the work for the construction of the new building had begun, Carlos Alfonso's building was never built. The wholesale market unlike Les Halles in Paris was not relocated and little effort was made for its continuance.

=== Parti pris ===
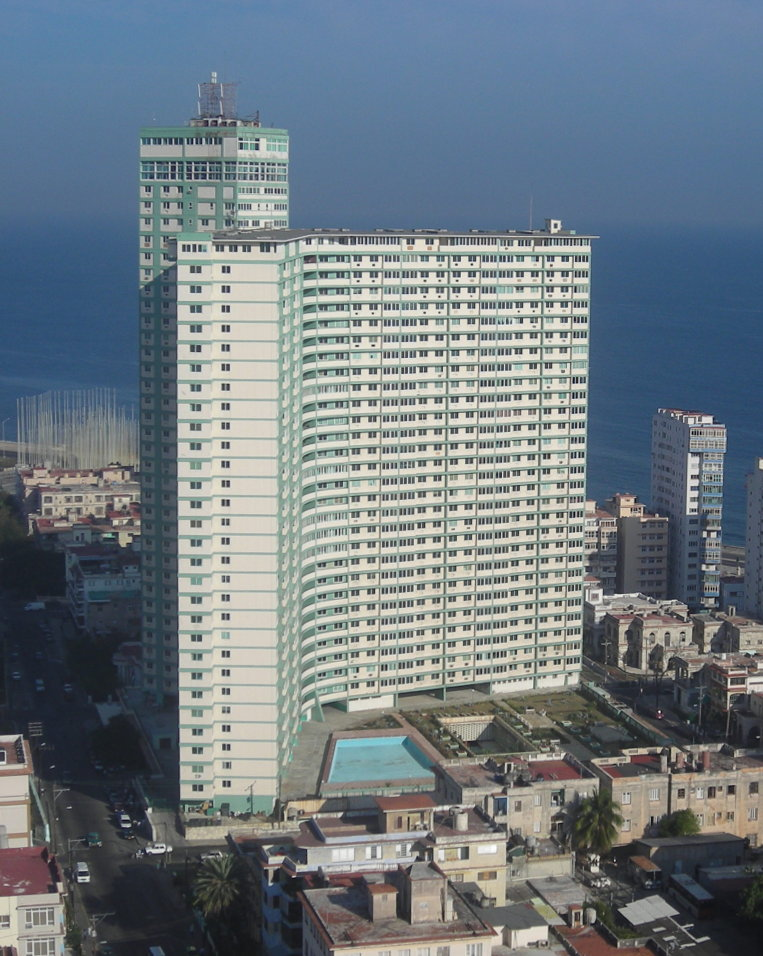
Similar site distribution of the FOCSA building, Havana, Cuba

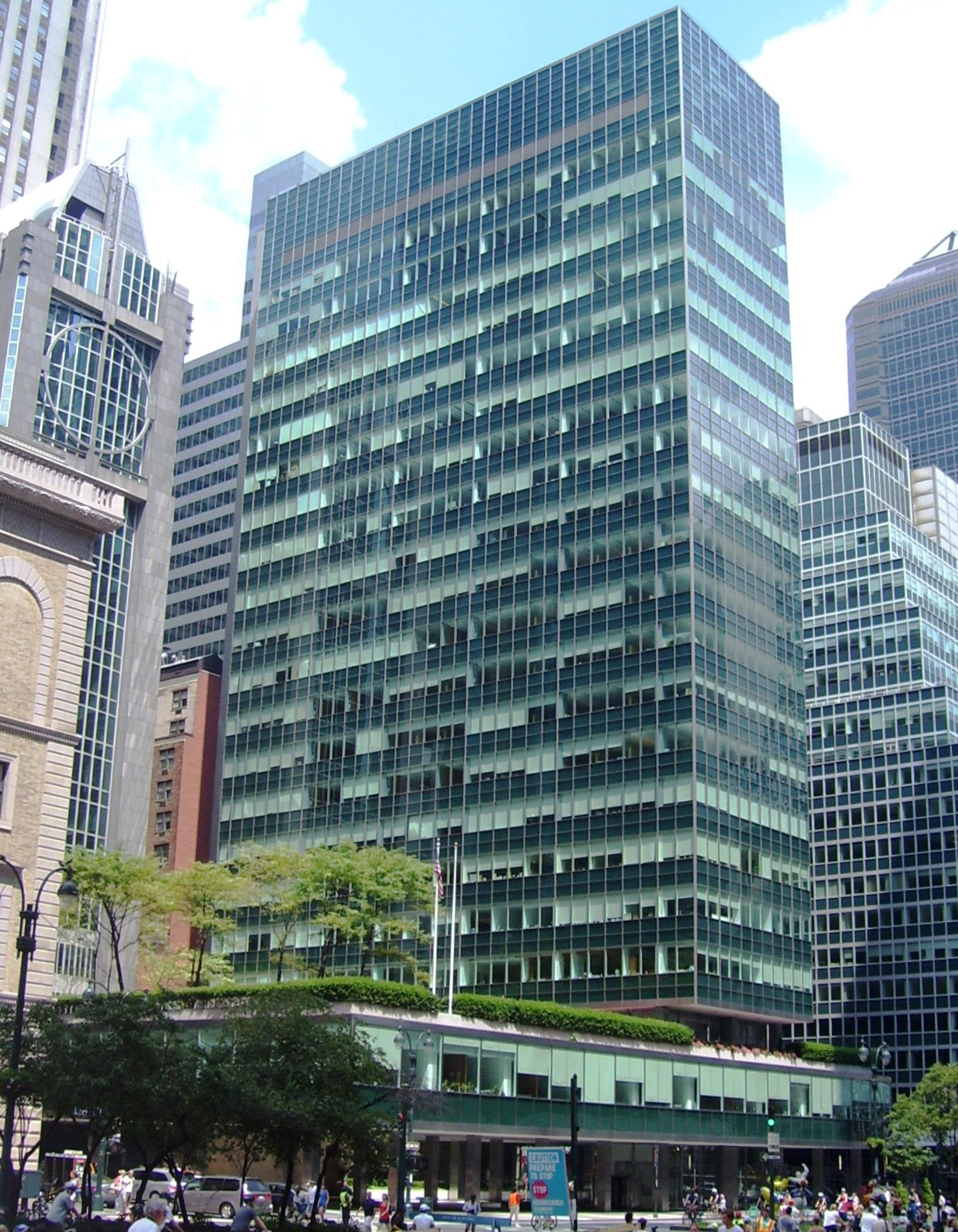
Lever House at 390 Park Avenue between East 53rd and 54th Streets in Midtown Manhattan, New York City, was built in 1950-52 and was designed by Gordon Bunshaft of Skidmore, Owings & Merrill in the International style. In 2003, the curtain wall was replaced, designed by SM&O. It has 21 floors and is 94 metres (308 ft) tall. (Sources: AIA Guide to NYC (5th ed.)

The parti (Note: "A primary protagonist was Rudolf Wittkower, who had published important essays on role of geometry in the works of Alberti and Palladio, essays later collected in Architectural Principles in the Age of Humanism (1949, 1962). The book includes Palladio's Geometry: the Villas, in which Wittkower argues that a similar organizational schema underlies all the villas of Palladio. Wittkower's diagrams of the villas are variations of a three-bay by a three-bay diagram; a nine-square grid. Wittkower suggests that Palladio's villas can be considered as a single conceptual project based on variations of an ideal plan diagram: “What was in Palladio's mind when he experimented over and over again with the same elements? Once he had found the basic geometric pattern for the problem ‘villa,’ he adapted it as clearly and as simply as possible to the special requirements of each commission. He reconciled the truth at hand with the ‘certain truth’ of mathematics which is final and unchangeable.”) (Note: A Parti pris is an organizing thought or decision behind an architect's design, presented in the form of a basic diagram or a simple statement. It may be shortened to "parti". The term comes from 15th century French, in which "parti pris" meant "decision taken." Later, it took on the meaning of "bias" or "prejudice".) of the site's area distribution of the proposed project to replace the Plaza del Vapor is similar to that of the FOCSA Building, Edificio del Seguro Médico, and the 1952 Lever House on Manhattan's Park Avenue. A concrete slab acts as a podium which in the three cases is the connection of the tower to the street. In the Lever House, there is an open plaza and a garden with pedestrian walkways. Only a small portion of the ground floor is enclosed. The second and largest floor contained the employees' lounge, medical suite, and general office facilities. The third floor contains the employees' cafeteria and terrace. The offices of Lever Brothers and its subsidiaries occupied the remaining floors with the executive penthouse on the 21st floor. The top three stories contained most of the property's mechanical space.

== Gallery ==
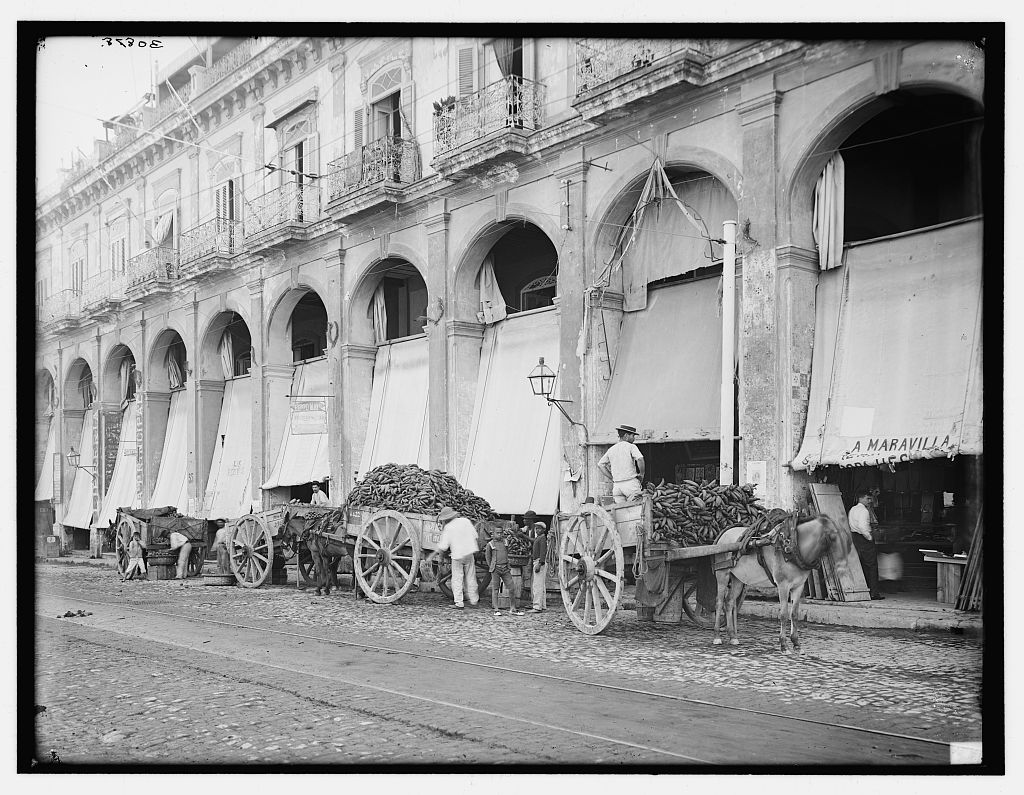
Vendors along Calle Galiano.

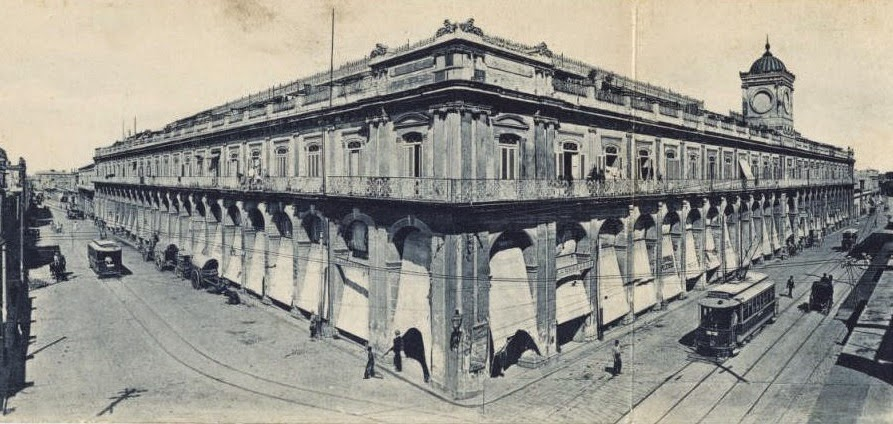
Plaza del Vapor showing the Calle Galiano at the corner of Calle Reina, 1900.

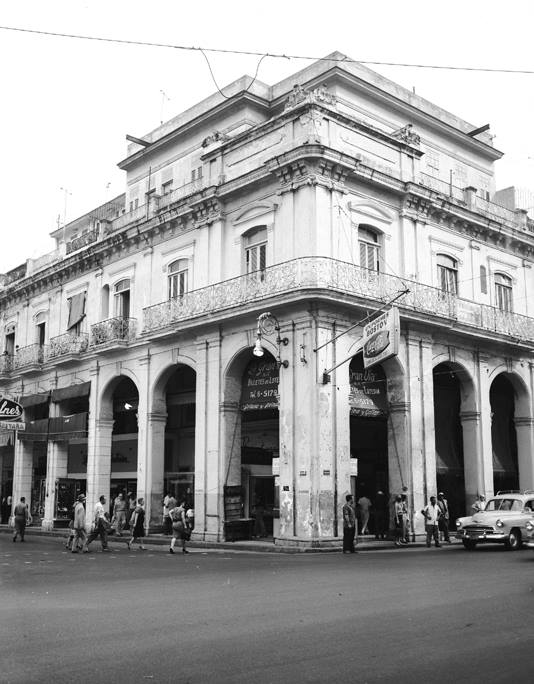
Corner Calle Galiano and Reina, with added structure on roof

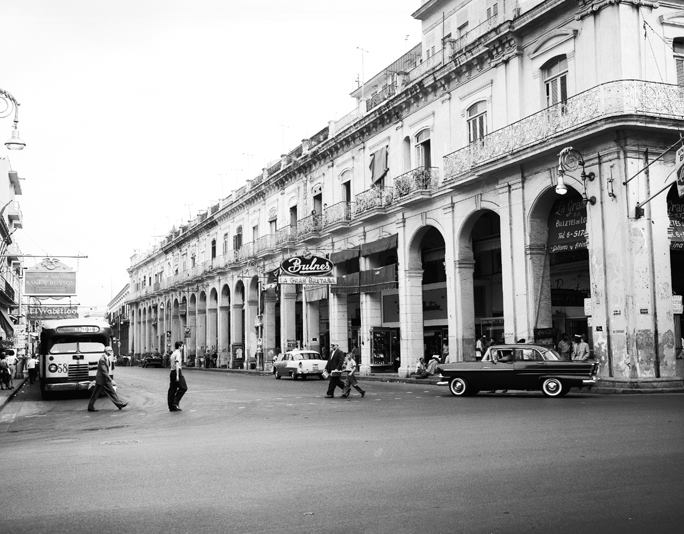

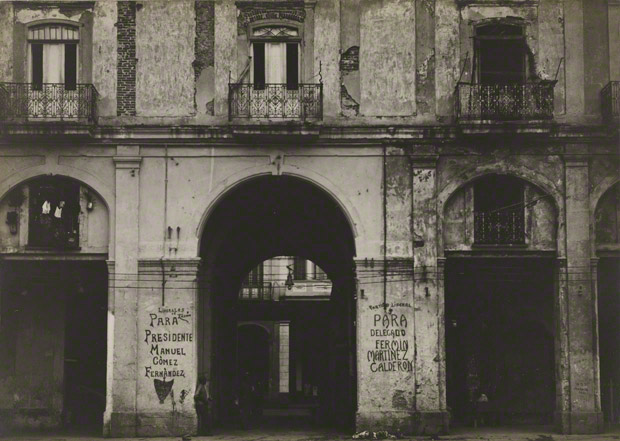
exit from square to calle Reina (1933)

== See also ==
- Chinese Cubans
- Campo de Marte, Havana
- Palacio de Aldama
- Palacio de la Marquesa de Villalba
- Tacón Theatre
- Les Halles
- El Capitolio
- List of buildings in Havana
