= Palacio de Aldama =

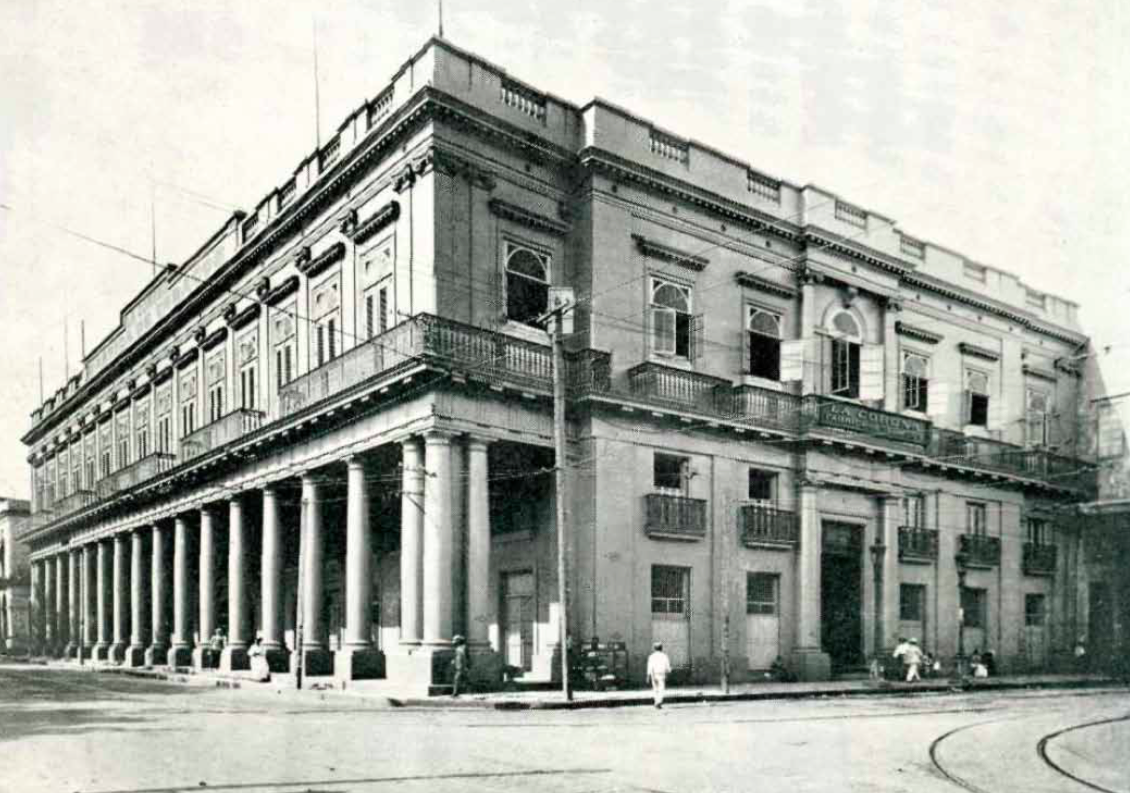
- El Palacio de Aldama
- Interactive map of the Palacio de Aldama area

General information
- Status: Occupied
- Type: Courtyard
- Architectural style: Neoclassical
- Location: Amistad Street, Ciudad de La Habana, Cuba
- Coordinates: 23.1321°N 82.3610°W
- Current tenants: Instituto de Historia de Cuba
- Completed: 1840
- Owner: Revolutionary government

Technical details
- Structural system: Load bearing
- Material: Stone
- Floor count: 3

Design and construction
- Architect: Manuel José Carrerá

The Palacio de Aldama is a neoclassical mansion located diagonally opposite to the old Plaza del Vapor (Parque del Curita), and in front of the old Campo de Marte; present day Parque de la Fraternidad, in Havana, Cuba. Built in 1840 by the Dominican architect and engineer Manuel José Carrera, its main facade of columns spans one block on Calle Amistad between Calles Reina and Estrella.

== History ==
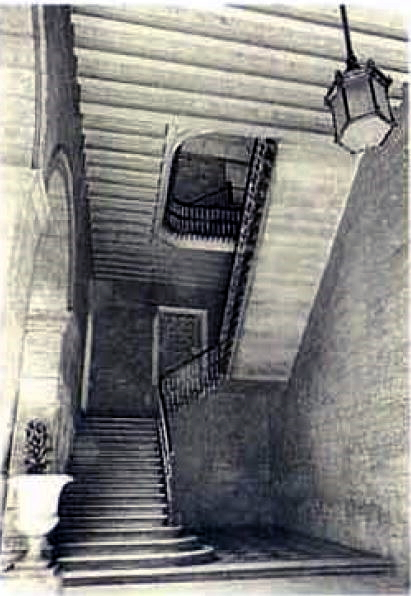
Palacio de Aldama stair in 1955

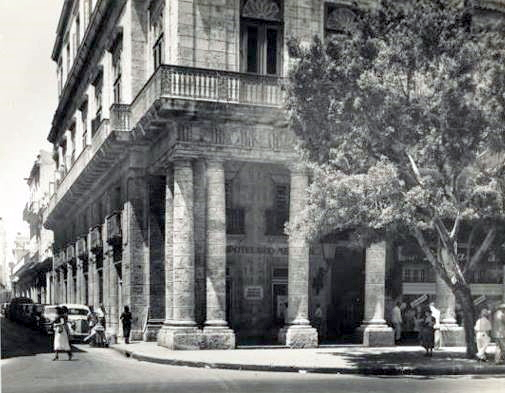
Palacio de Aldama, south east corner. Havana, Cuba.

The Aldama Palace was assaulted by Spanish volunteers on the night of January 24, 1869. Its owner at that time, Don Miguel de Aldama and Alfonso – son of the building's builder – was a recognized enemy of Spain and conspirator since Narciso López's time. (Note: When still a young man, Narciso López fought for the Spanish at the Battle of Las Queseras del Medio (1819) and the Battle of Carabobo (1821) against the forces for independence led by Simón Bolívar, José Antonio Páez and others. When the Spanish army withdrew in defeat to Cuba after the decisive Battle of Lake Maracaibo (1823), López, who had fought in this battle, left with the Spanish as did many other survivors including Calixto García de Luna e Izquierdo, who would be grandfather of Cuban Independence major general Calixto García. In 1825 in Cuba he married the sister of the Count of Pozos Dulces, María Dolores, with whom he had a son. Narciso López, who had earned the rank of colonel of the Spanish Army in Venezuela at the early age of twenty-one, fought in the First Carlist War. After the war, López continued to serve the Spanish government in several administrative posts, including the Cortes for the city of Seville and as military governor in Madrid. López moved to Cuba as an assistant to the new capitan general, but lost his post when the governorship changed hands in 1843. After failing in a few business ventures, he became a partisan of the anti-Spanish faction in Cuba. In 1848, during a Spanish arrest of Cuban revolutionaries, López fled to the United States. The present Flag of Cuba is adopted from López's expeditionary banner.) A man so rich and powerful that, despite his ideas and pro Cuban views, Spain, far from punishing him, wanted to attract him with the offer of the title of marquis; Don Miguel refused. In addition, there was another reason that prompted the most intransigent Spanish element, represented by the volunteers, to the looting of that mansion and was the insistent rumor that, by the will of its owner, that royal palace would be the residence of the future presidents of Cuba.

Thus, the Spanish Volunteer Corps assaulted the palace under the pretext that Domingo del Monte had a catch of weapons inside of the Palacio. The looting of the Aldama Palace, three months after the start of the first war for independence, is linked to various events that took place under the command of Captain General Domingo Dulce y Garay, Marquis of Castell-Florit, whose main cause was the encounter between the Spaniards and the Cubans and the hostility that the volunteers felt for the ruler whom they held as weak, and whom they accused of complicity in events contrary to Spain, including, those of Miguel Aldama. Street riots had occurred on January 12 after the volunteers during a search had found a stash of weapons in a house on Calle Carmen during the burial of Camilo Cepeda, a young Cuban killed in jail. The Volunteers returned on the 24th and a troop of them fired their weapons into the ‘’El Louvre’’ cafe, those who tried to flee, were attacked by bayonet. There were seven dead and numerous wounded, all of them Spanish.

The Third and Fifth battalions, and the Ligeros battalion, concentrated before the Palace and knocked down one of the doors. They said to look for weapons and, indeed, they found them, but not of those that could be used in the manigua in the war against Spain, it was a collection of ancient weapons ——Japanese, Hindu, Norman, Inca, etc.—— that the Aldama family had collected. The Spanish Volunteers destroyed the art gallery and searched the cabinets and appropriated everything that could be taken, what could not be carried, they destroyed: crockery, lamps, crystals, books, art objects of all kinds. They set fire to the damask or lace curtains and doors and windows were torn off of the masonry, or shot. They also visited the wineries of the Palace, lit a bonfire in the Field of Mars and had the carved furniture and oriental tapestries burned.

=== Property confiscated ===
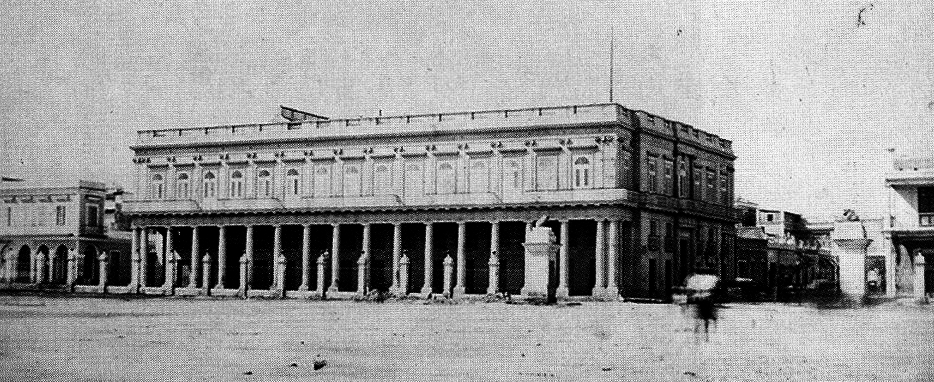
Palacio de Aldama ca. 1890 showing fence of Campo de Marte

The Aldama mansion was in the care at that time of two or three servants who were the victims of the humiliation and mistreatment; the family was saved from the fury of the aggressors for not being in the house, an old English maid was stripped of her life's savings by volunteers. That January 24 was Sunday and, like all holidays, the Aldama family spent it at their Santa Rosa farm, in Matanzas. There, they received the news and also the threat that the farm would suffer the same fate. They did not delay in leaving the Island; all their properties were confiscated. In New York, Miguel Aldama assumed the direction of the General Agency of the Republic of Cuba in Arms and put at the service of his ideas what was left of his immense fortune. He died in 1888 in exile and in misery.

As a result of these events, it the Palace was confiscated by the colonial government until 1878 when, by the transitory pacification of the Island, by the Pact of Zanjón, it was returned to its owners. It has been affirmed that this palace was destined to be the seat of the government of the republic, mentioned in this regard in a phrase of the martyr Domingo de Goicouría.

The looting caused much damage to the property, they only found weapons from the defendant's personal collection. As a result of this assault, Don Aldama left the country. After his death on April 11, 1870, a trial was commenced in Havana to determine if his heirs Miguel and Leonardo Aldama could inherit the property, it was an option denied by the colonial court, and as a result, the Aldana Palace passed on to the metropolitan government. With the signing of the Pact of the Zanjón, the Aldama family had their rights reinstated but never again was the palace occupied by its owners or any family member.

After the death of Don Miguel Aldama, the mansion was auctioned and the new owners installed the tobacco factory "La Corona," which was subsequently sold to the English company "The Havana Cigar and Tobacco Factories Limited," which modified the Palace by adding a third floor. In 1932 after a bloody tobacco strike the company closed the building and in 1945 it was planned to be demolished; by protest of cultural and artistic societies, it was saved and declared a National Monument on June 9, 1949, by decree. Prior to the Cuban Revolution, there was the Mendoza Mortgage Bank, and other private companies.

== Architecture ==
=== Two houses ===
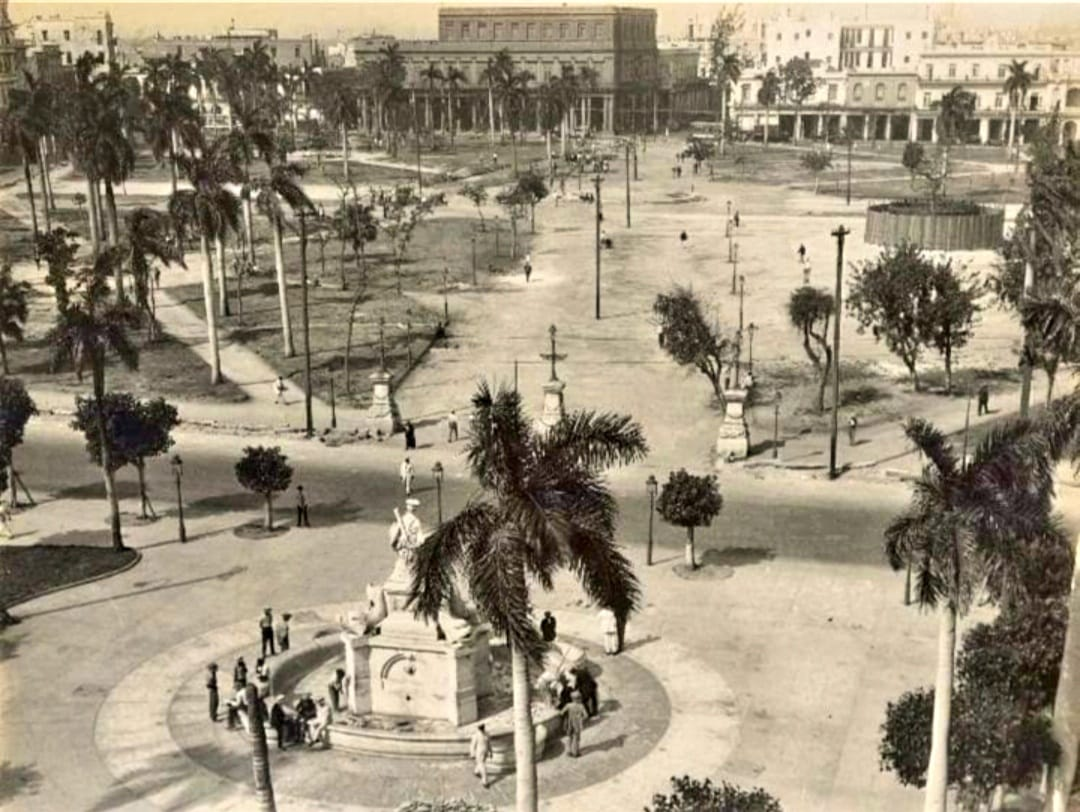
Palacio de Aldama from the Campo Marte. Havana, Cuba

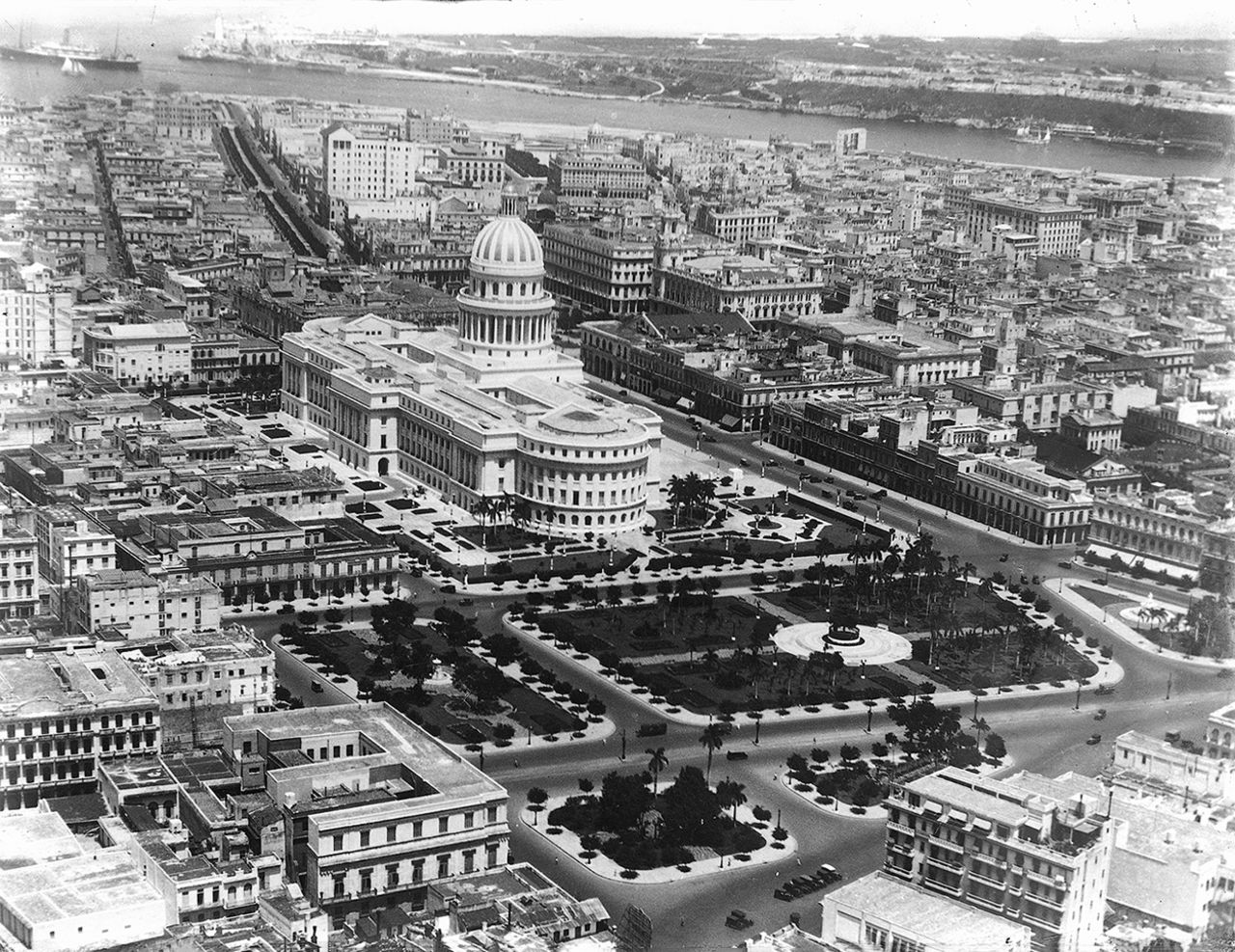
Parque de la Fraternidad, Capitolio Nacional, Palacio de Aldama, and El Paseo del Prado, Havana, aerial view, 1931 (Oficina del Historiador de La Habana).

The Palacio de Aldama was built in 1840, and had two floors and a mezzanine; it is estimated that its cost was around one million pesos, a great sum for the time notes Dr. Juan de las Cuevas. The Aldama Palace is actually two adjoining houses, "treated as an architectural unit of exceptional monumentality." The larger house, that of Domingo Aldama and Arréchaga, located on the north side of the site, the other, that of his daughter Rosa who was married to the writer Domingo del Monte. (Note: The patio of the Palacio de las Palmas, the proposed Presidential Palace of the Havana Plan Piloto was recognized by Josep Lluís Sert as a feature of several historical structures in Havana including the Palacio de Aldama. The Palacio de Aldama was one of the grand colonial residences in Havana, and Sert’s notes indicate that he visited it and recognized its patio as a precedent. The Palacio de Aldama was owned by the family of Emilio del Junco’s wife, and del Junco was one of the circle of architects professionally and personally acquainted with Sert and Romañach)Domingo del Monte was born in Maracaibo, Venezuela from a wealthy family, his parents were Leonardo del Monte y Medrano, an assistant and Lieutenant for the Governor in that city native of Santo Domingo, and Rosa Aponte y Sánchez, the daughter and heir of a known and influential planter. Del Monte attended preschool while living in Venezuela, before his parents moved to Dominican Republic, and thereafter to Cuba in 1810. A few years later, when Del Monte was a twelve-year-old, his parents enrolled him into the Seminary of San Carlos, a catholic alma mater of Leonardo Gamboa in the novel Cecilia Valdés by Cirilo Villaverde (1812–1894). He completed studies at the University of Havana and right after graduation, around the 1820s, he had a notable influence as an associate for a prominent lawyer in Havana, who shortly after, financed a trip throughout Europe and the United States for the young Del Monte. In April 1834, Del Monte married Rosa Aldama, the daughter of a wealthy planter named Miguel de Aldama. He proposed marriage to her on the Philharmonic Society salon. Rosa's father was Domingo de Aldama y Arechaga, ranked as the twelfth richest in an 1836 survey of the most wealthy Cubans.

=== The first house ===
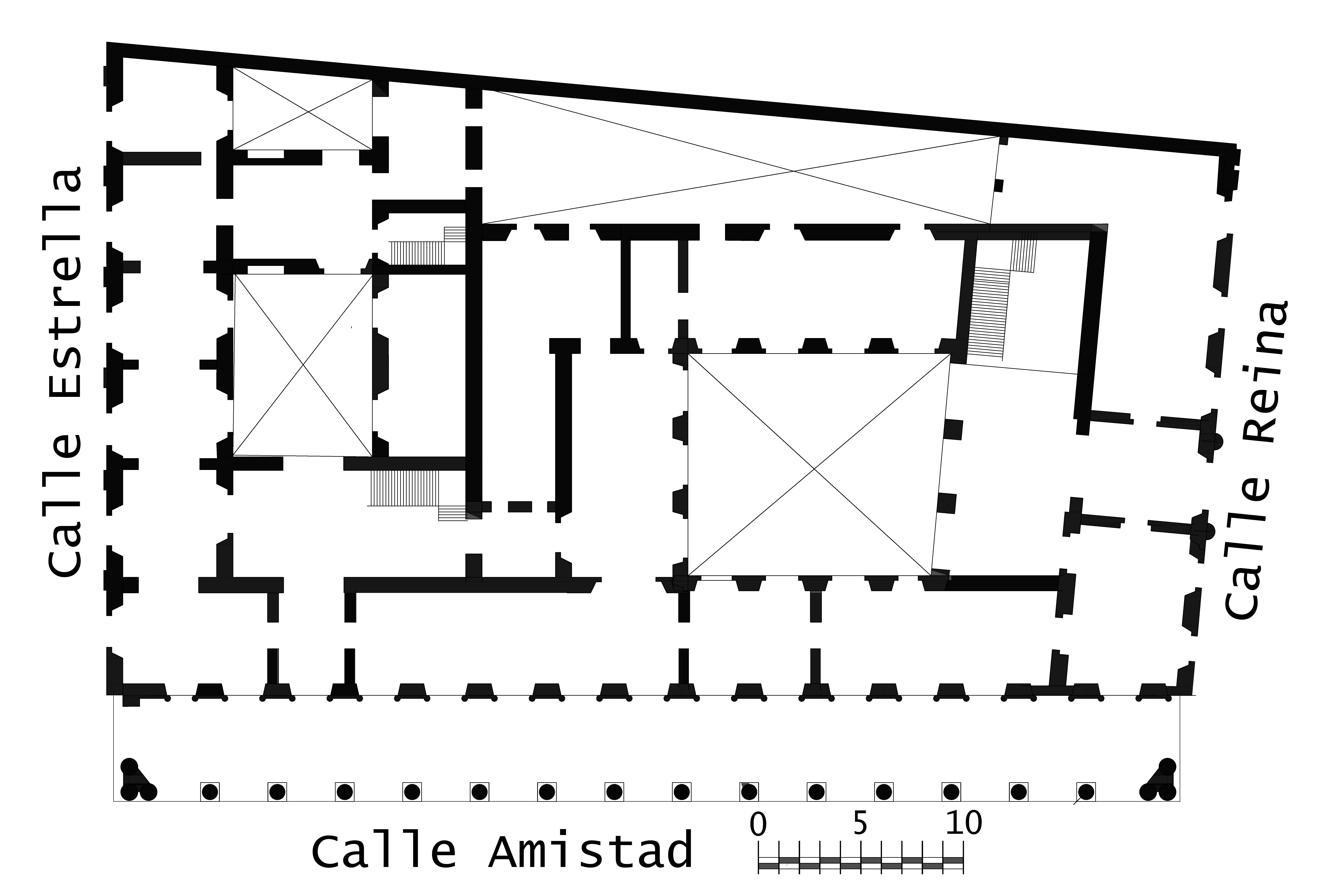
Palacio de Aldama. First floor plan.

The first house was designed by José Manuel Carrerá, an architect of Dominican origin and is linked to all his companies and the projects of the Alfonso family, which was his wife's, especially the railway network that both deployed in the province of Matanzas. The influence of Don Domingo Aldama is revealed in the fact that in order to authorize him to construct the Palace, the Spanish authorities repealed an order prohibiting civil constructions in the military zone; that is, adjacent to the Campo de Marte, although the Palace's front elevation was required to face that space. Las Cuevas Toraya notes that it is a masonry house, even the interior partitions, and draws attention to the main staircase, built with Carrara marble blocks, the treads are adjusted to each other without any added external support. The building has a dining room that was designed for more than one hundred people. The arcade has a height of two floors, covering the ground floor and the mezzanine. An upper deck is supported by the capital decorations, typical of neoclassical constructions, although it has some elements of the late Baroque (Note: "The Baroque Revival, also known as Neo-Baroque, was an architectural style of the late 19th century. The term is used to describe architecture and architectural sculptures which display important aspects of Baroque style, but are not of the original Baroque period. Elements of the Baroque architectural tradition were an essential part of the curriculum of the École des Beaux-Arts in Paris, the pre-eminent school of architecture in the second half of the 19th century, and are integral to the Beaux-Arts architecture it engendered both in France and abroad. An ebullient sense of European imperialism encouraged an official architecture to reflect it in Britain and France, and in Germany and Italy the Baroque revival expressed pride in the new power of the unified state." Source: Baroque Revival architecture) and the Renaissance.

=== Ashlar ===
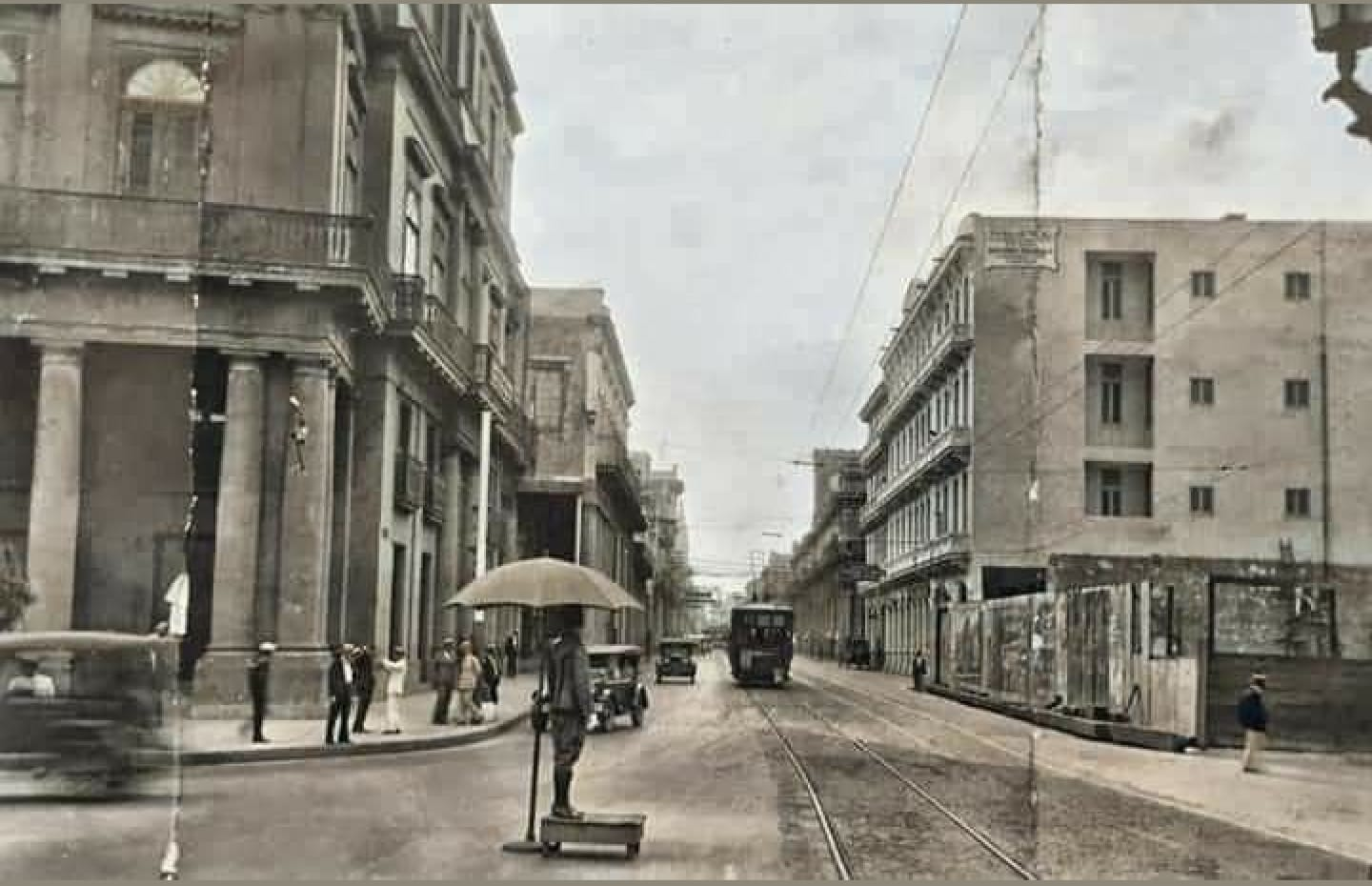
Palacio de Aldana on the left showing Calle Reina, tower of Plaza del Vapor in the background.

The Palacio de Aldama is constructed of ashlar stone masonry, a finely dressed (cut, worked) stone, either an individual stone that was worked until squared. Ashlar is the finest stone masonry unit, generally rectangular cuboid, mentioned by Vitruvius as opus isodomum, or less frequently trapezoidal. Precisely cut "on all faces adjacent to those of other stones", ashlar is capable of very thin joints between blocks, and the visible face of the stone may be quarry-faced or feature a variety of treatments: tooled, smoothly polished, or rendered with another material for decorative effect. (Note: Ashlar blocks have been used in the construction of many buildings as an alternative to brick or other materials. In classical architecture, ashlar wall surfaces were often contrasted with rustication. The term is frequently used to describe the dressed stone work of prehistoric Greece and Crete, although the dressed blocks are usually much larger than modern day ashlar. For example, the tholos tombs of Bronze Age Mycenae use ashlar masonry in the construction of the so-called "beehive" dome. This dome consists of finely cut ashlar blocks that decrease in size and terminate in a central capstone. These domes are not true domes, but are constructed using the corbel arch. Ashlar masonry was heavily used in the construction of palace facades on Crete, including Knossos and Phaistos. These constructions date to the MM III-LM Ib period, ca. 1700–1450 BC. In modern European masonry, the blocks are generally about 35 centimetres (14 in) in height. When shorter than 30 centimetres (12 in), they are usually called small ashlar.) Ashlar may be coursed, which involves lengthy horizontals layers of stone blocks laid in parallel, and therefore with continuous horizontal joints. Ashlar may also be random, which involves stone blocks laid with deliberately discontinuous courses and therefore discontinuous joints both vertically and horizontally. In either case, it generally uses a joining material such as mortar to bind the blocks together, although dry ashlar construction, metal ties, and other methods of assembly have been used.

== Expropriation ==
In the 1960s, like many other properties in Havana, the Palacio de Aldama was confiscated and nationalized without any compensation.

=== Revolution ===
With the triumph of the Cuban Revolution, the building was assigned in 1965 to the Academy of Sciences. In 1968, the Institute of Ethnology and Folklore was installed in the Palacio which demolished the third floor and restored its original appearance. In 1974 the government turned the Palacio de Aldama over to the Institute for the Studies of Communism and Socialism. Finally, in 1987 it became the Instituto de Historia de Cuba.

== See also ==
- List of buildings in Havana
- Neoclassical architecture
- Parque de la Fraternidad
- Plaza del Vapor, Havana
- Havana Plan Piloto
