= Count of Pozos Dulces =

- Creation date: 24 June 1790
- Peerage: Spanish nobility
- First holder: Melchor Jacob y Ortiz-Rojano
- Present holder: Vacant
- Subsidiary titles: Viscount of la Albufera

Count of Pozos Dulces is a Spanish title created on 24 June 1790, along with the viscountcy of la Albufera, by Charles IV of Spain for Melchor Jacot y Ortiz Rojano, son of José Jacot y Ruiz de la Escalera (1702–1738.)

Melchor Jacot y Ortiz-Rojano was Robed Minister of the 'Consejo Supremo de las Indias', First Regent of Lima's Audience, and Knight of the Order of Carlos III.

According to the Permanent Deputation and Council of Grandees of Spain and Titles of the Kingdom, the title "has been vacant for more than 200 years".

== List of counts of Pozos Dulces ==
	Holder	Period
Created by King Carlos IV of Spain
I	Melchor Jacot y Ortiz-Rojano	1790–1807
II	María Luisa López de Maturana y Eguilar (1759–1832)	1808–1832
III	Bernarda Josefa Jacot y Martínez-Heto, Ortiz-Rojano y Ávila (born 1773)	1834–1845
IV	Francisco María Sánchez de Frías y Jacot (1809–1877)	1845–1877
Present – Vacant
