= Parque de la Fraternidad =

Campo de Marte
- Parque de la Fraternidad
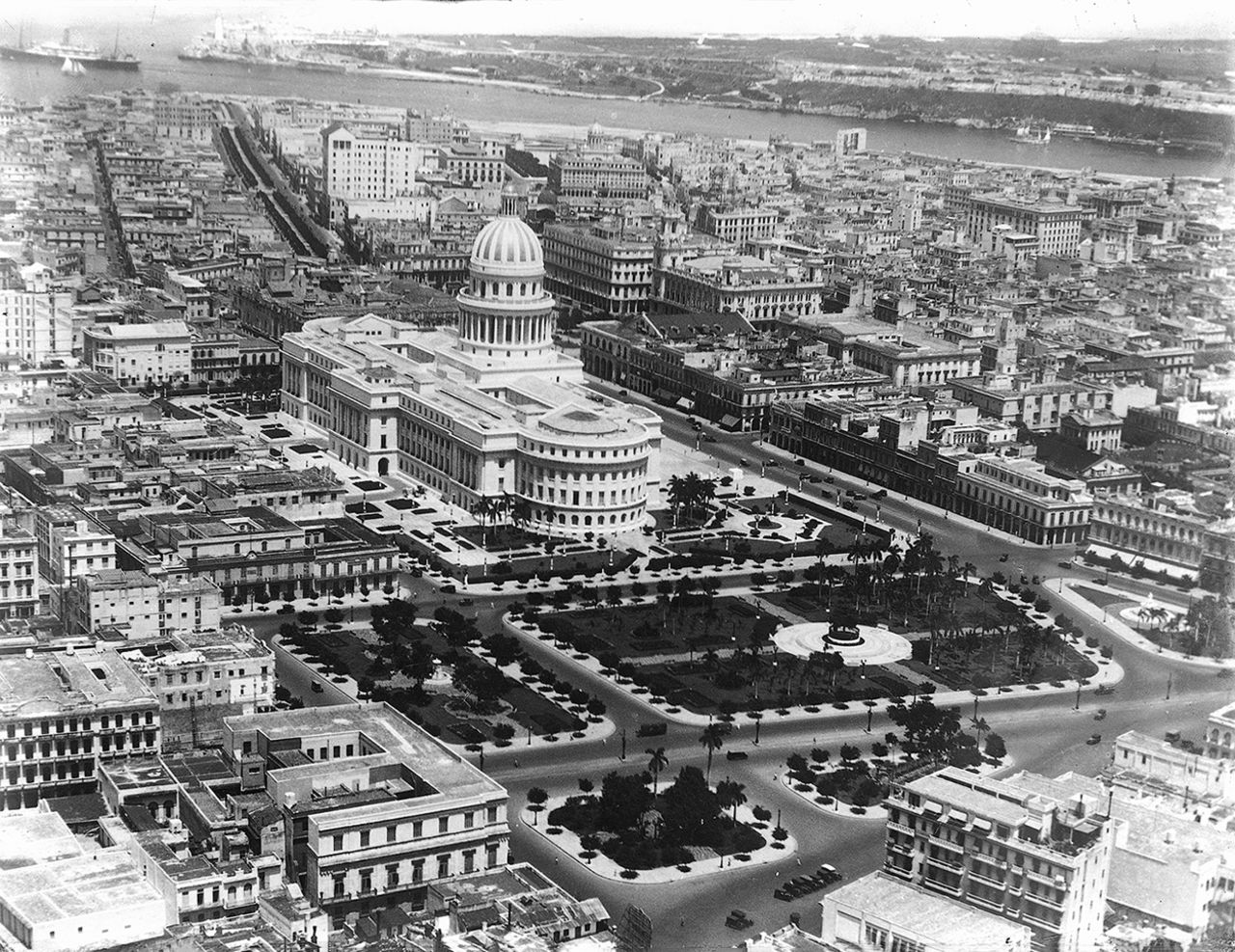
- Alternative names: Paque de la Fraternidad

General information
- Location: Ciudad de La Habana, Cuba
- Coordinates: 23.1331829°N 82.3593186°W

The Parque de la Fraternidad (formerly the Campo de Marte) was built in the 1790s as a military practice range by the Spanish government, It was expanded in 1793 by Belgian engineer Agustin Cramer, and later Bishop Espada improved the lighting of the Campo. It was Captain General Don Miguel Tacón who included it within the scope of his embellishment program. The area was then fenced and four majestic gates, crowned with coats of arms, each representing an important personality: the north gate, Hernán Cortés; the south one, Francisco Pizarro; and the east and west gates, Captain General (Spanish: Capitanía General de Cuba) Miguel Tacón y Rosique (1834–1838), (Note: Miguel Tacón y Rosique ( Cartagena , January 10, 1775 - Madrid , October 12, 1855 ) First Marquis of the Union of Cuba, (later elevated to Duchy), Duke of the Union of Cuba, was a nobleman, sailor and Spanish military , Lieutenant General of the Royal Navy , Field Marshal of the Army of Earth and I Duke of the Union of Cuba.) and Christopher Columbus respectively.

In 1928 it became the Parque de la Fraternidad.

== History ==
=== Beginnings ===
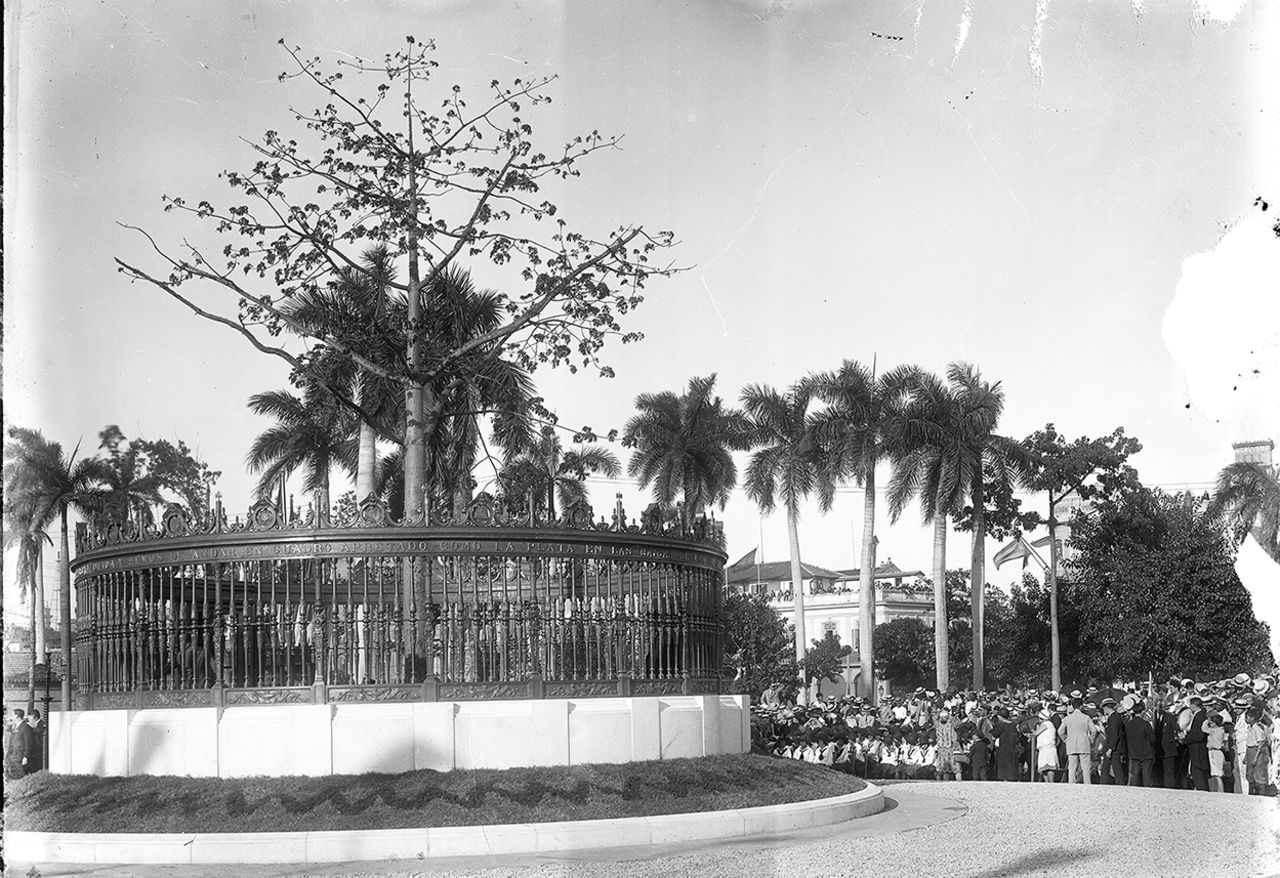
Campo de Marte, Havana. Fence and plinth surrounding the Árbol de la Fraternidad, Havana, 1928 (Oficina del Historiador de La Habana).

In the seventeenth century, the grounds of what was to become the Field of Mars (Spanish: Campo de Marte) were part of a muddy and impassable area, it was located outside of the walls that surrounded the town of San Cristóbal de La Habana, and, in spite of its inhospitable location it began to be populaited into storage rooms and corrals for animals.

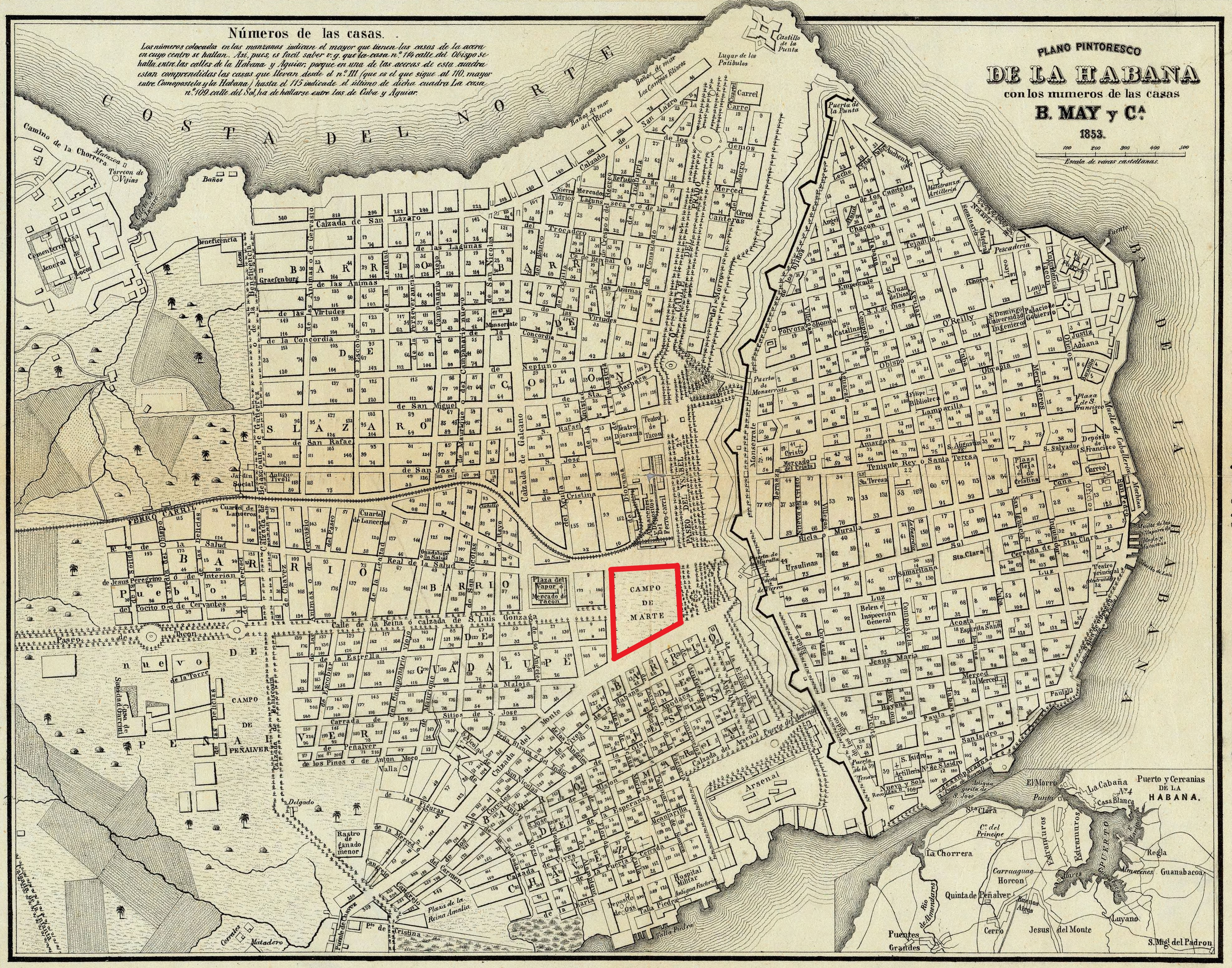
Map of Havana, 1853

In the 18th century the lands were part of an orchard that belonged Cabildo to Don Melchor de la Torre, and in 1735 they became the property of Don Ambrosio Menéndez. When the land was analyzed by a public surveyor Don Bartolomé de Flores, in charge of the demarcation and measurement, he found that instead of the original twelve solar mercedados there were twenty-eight and a half solares, so that the sixteen and a half surpluses were declared idle and unattached and relinquished to Doña Petronila Medrano as partial compensation for part of the land owned by her that had been expropriated for the construction of the city wall. The aforementioned surveyor assessed a group of said lots at two hundred and three pesos with five and a half reais each, and the remaining at one hundred and seventy-one pesos with seven and a half reais per lot.

=== 1892 ===
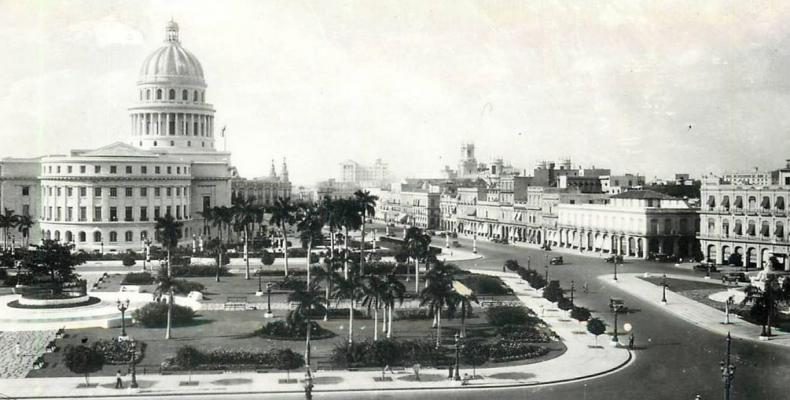
Parque de la Fraternidad, Capitolio Nacional, and El Paseo del Prado, Havana, aerial view, 1931 (Oficina del Historiador de La Habana).

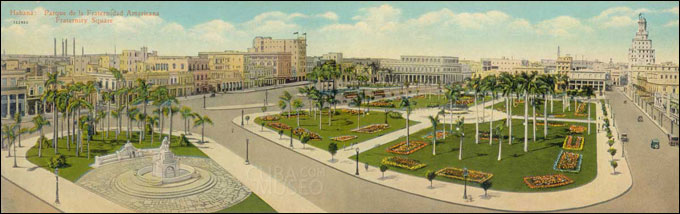
The Campo de Marte, Havana.

To commemorate the fourth centennial of the discovery of America, the Campo de Marte became a park in 1892. In 1928 it became the Parque de la Fraternidad as it is known today and in commemoration of the Sixth Pan-American Conference held in Havana. A silk cotton tree, called ‘Tree of American Fraternity, was planted in the center of the park with soil from 28 countries of the Americas. On the initiative of the Sociedad Cubana de Estudios Históricos e Internacionales, several busts of personalities and heroes representative of Latin American thought were erected, including those of Simón Bolivar and Benito Juárez.

The park, which is actually a group of parks, has witnessed historical events such as the taking off and disappearance of Matías Pérez, a Portuguese inventor, on his hot-air balloon on June 29, 1856; and the first celebration of Labor Day in Cuba on May 1, 1890.

== See also ==
- Paseo de Tacón
- Quinta de los molinos
- Havana Plan Piloto
- El Capitolio
- Plaza del Vapor, Havana
- Palacio de Aldama
- Fuente de la India
