= Goose foot =

Goosefoot or goose foot may refer to:

- The foot of a goose
- Chenopodium, the genus of plants known as goosefoots
- Chenopodiaceae, a defunct family of flowering plants now a part of Amaranthaceae
- Pes anserinus, meaning "goose foot", a tendinous structure in the human leg
- The parotid plexus, also known as pes anserinus.

== Other species ==
Other species with "goosefoot" in their common name include:

- Anseropoda placenta, goosefoot sea star (starfish)
- Aristolochia rotunda, the Mercury goosefoot
- Scrobipalpa atriplicella, the goosefoot groundling moth
- Viola purpurea, the goosefoot violet
- Viola pinetorum, the goosefoot yellow violet
- Eupithecia sinuosaria, the goosefoot pug
- Acer pensylvanicum, also known as goosefoot maple
- Syngonium podophyllum, also known as goosefoot

== See also ==
- Bird's foot (disambiguation)
- Chicken claw (disambiguation)
- Chicken foot (disambiguation)
- Crow foot (disambiguation)
- Eagle claw (disambiguation)
- Goose step (disambiguation)
- Pes anserinus (disambiguation)
