= Towers in the park =

Architectural and urban planning style

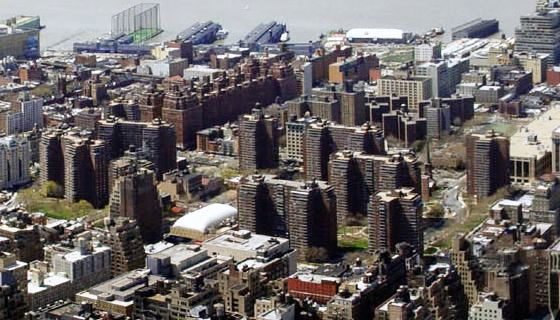
The Penn South cooperative (1962) in Manhattan

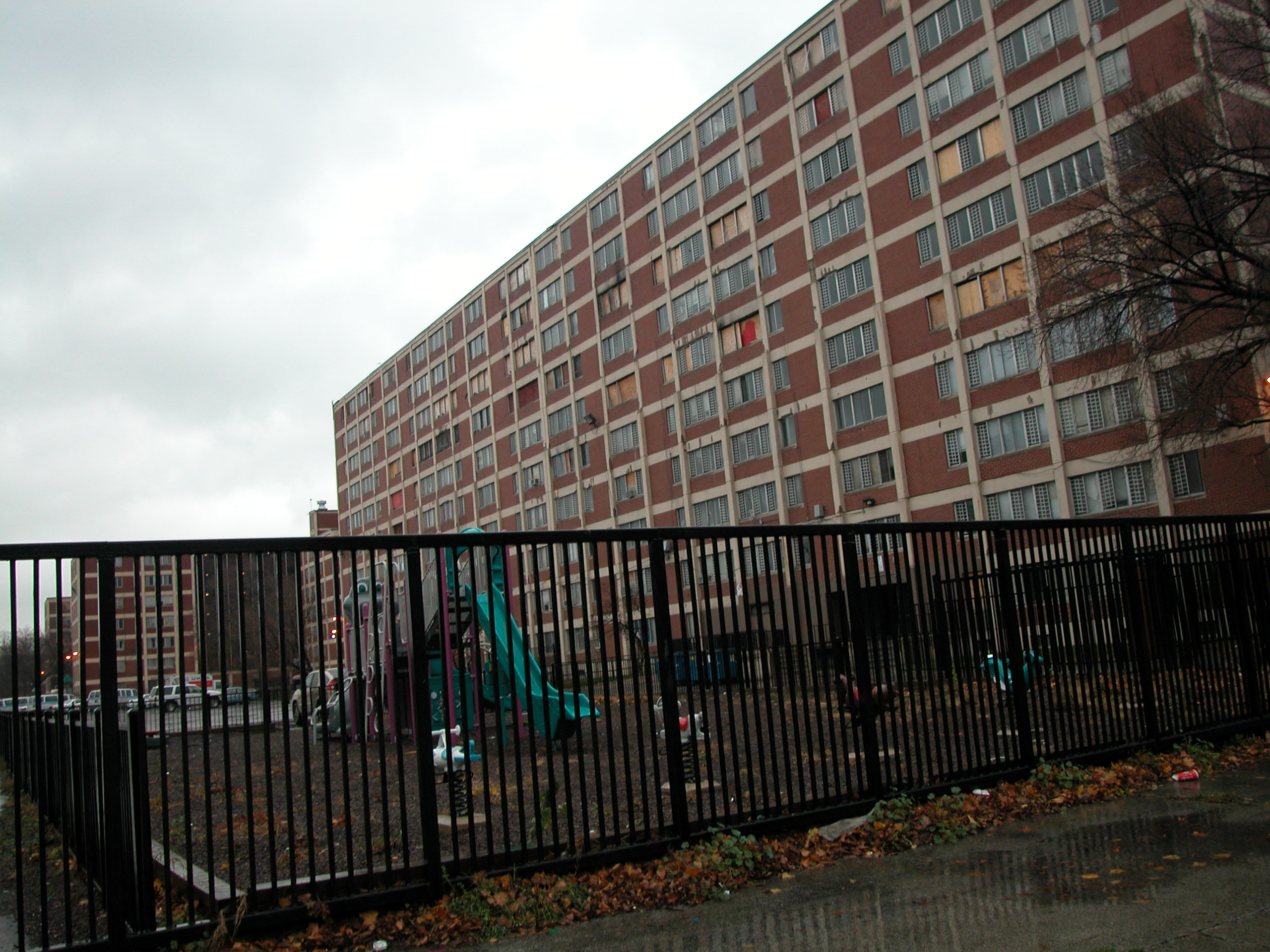
Cabrini-Green (1957 now demolished) in Chicago at ground level

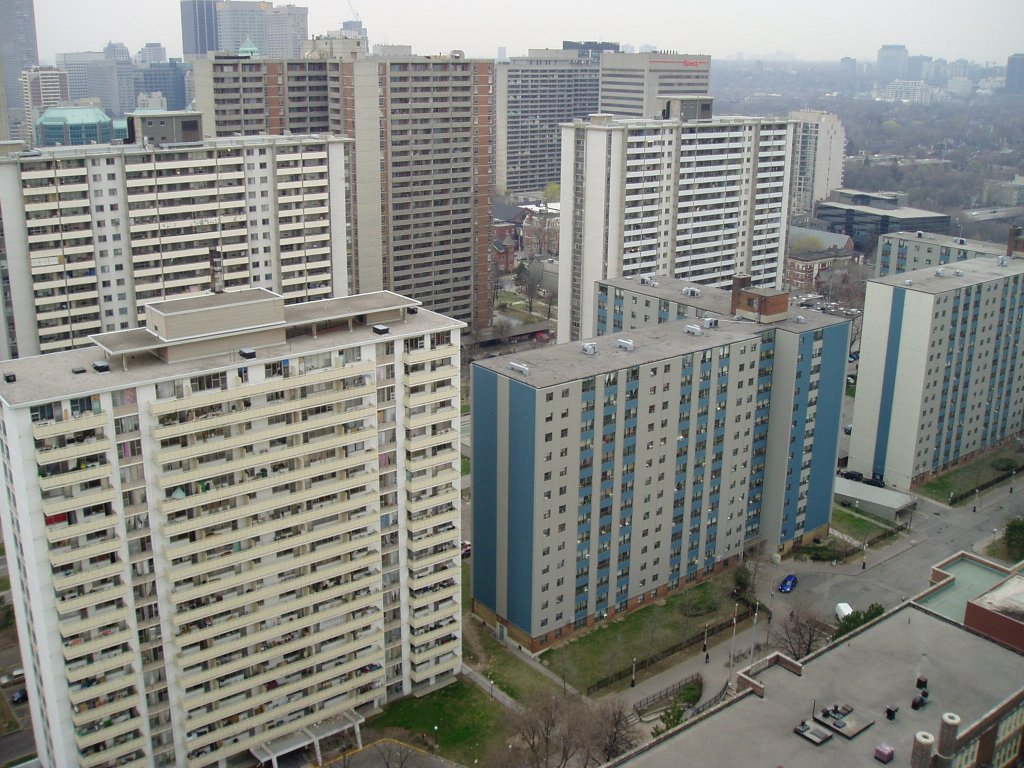
St. James Town in Toronto (1964-71)

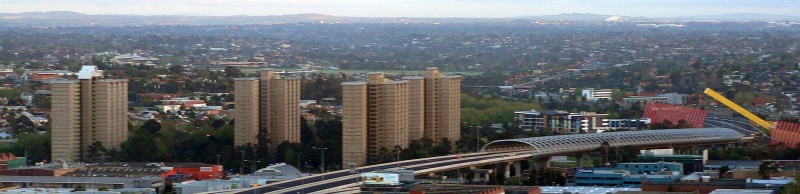
Debney Meadows (Flemington Estate) (1962–1965) in Melbourne

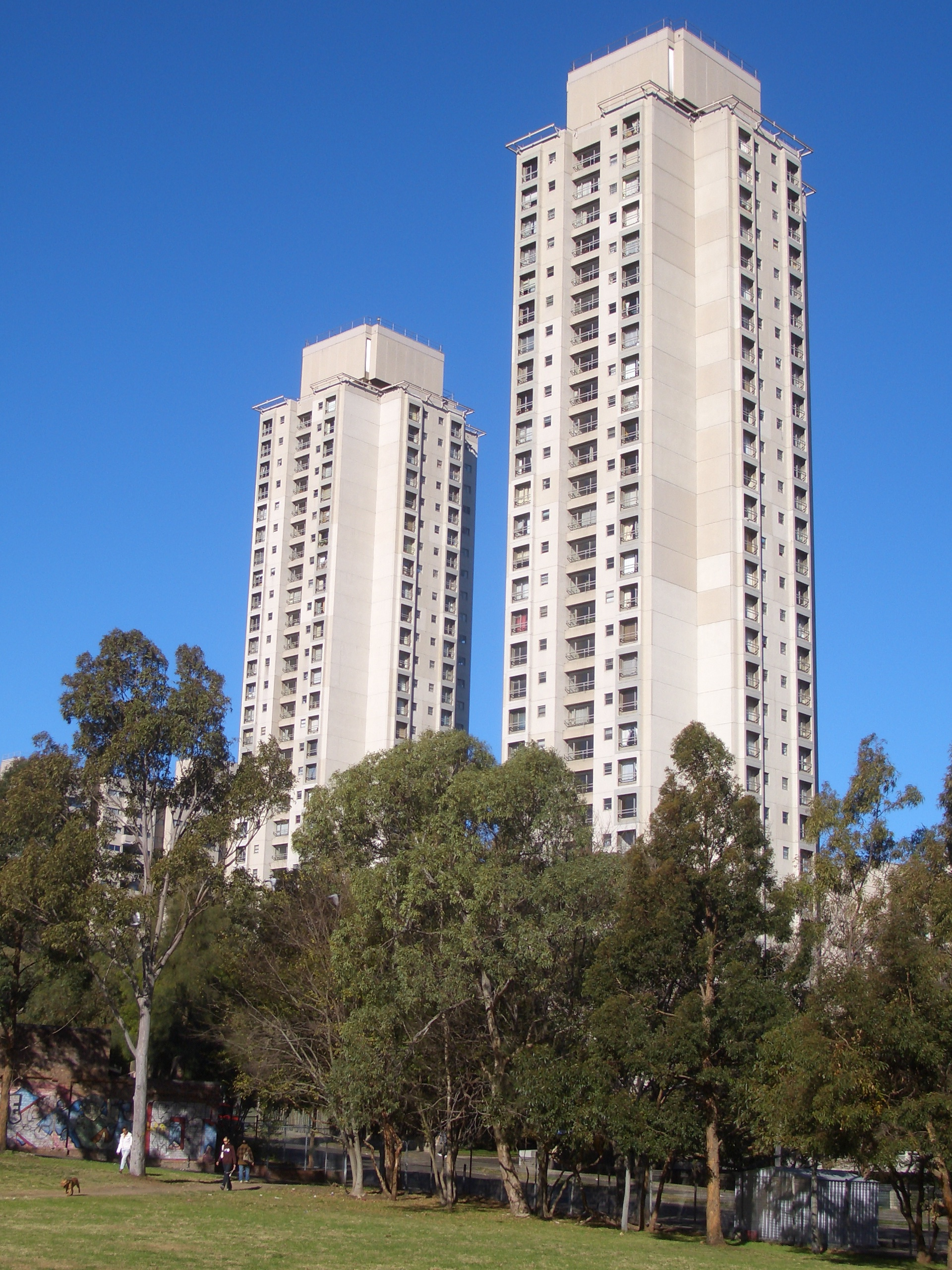
Waterloo Estate (1968) in Sydney

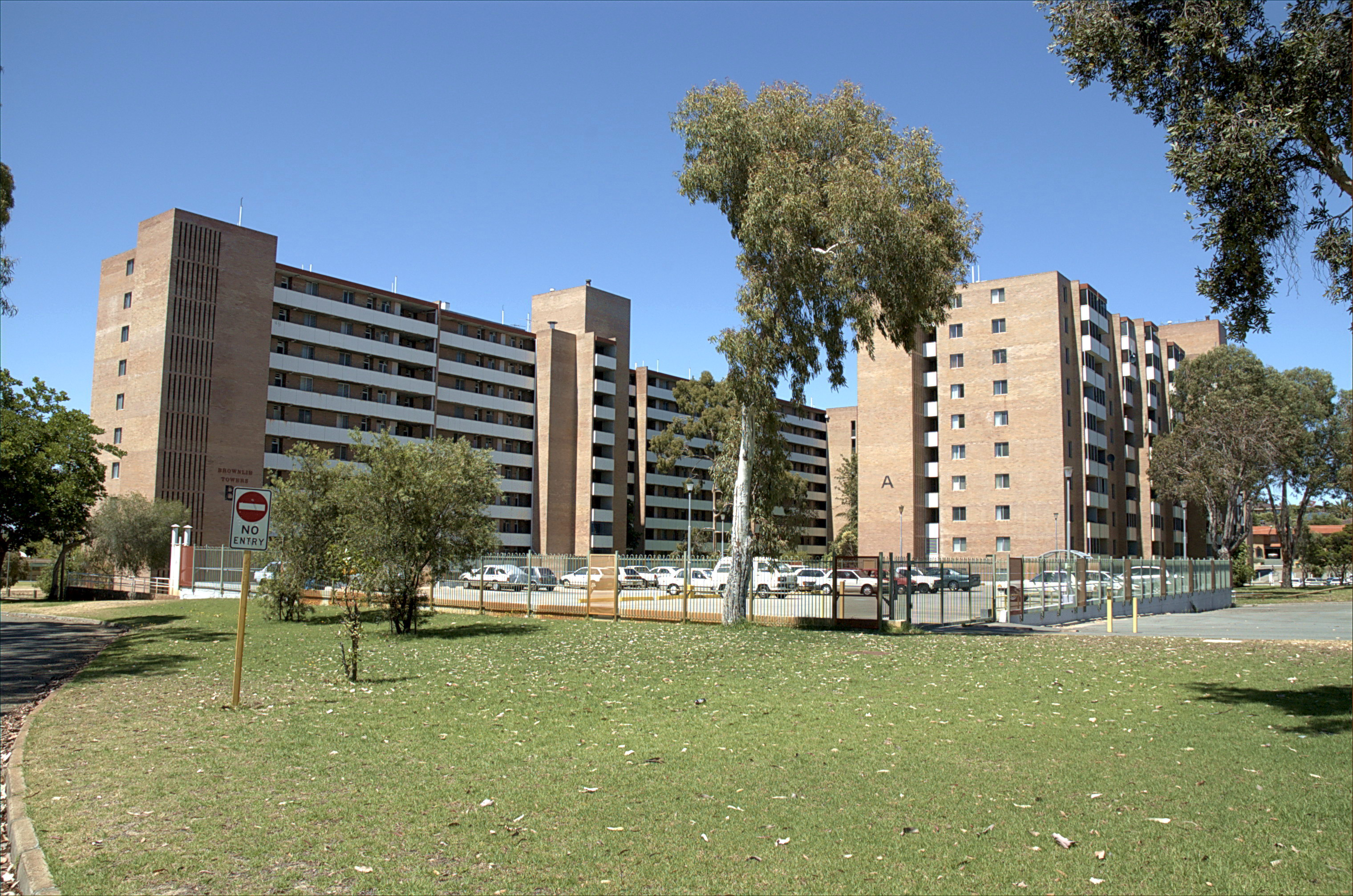
Brownlee Towers (1969 now demolished) in Perth

Towers in the park is a morphology of modernist high rise apartment buildings characterized by a high-rise building (a "slab") surrounded by a swath of landscaped land. Thus, the tower does not directly front the street.

It is based on an ideology popularised by Le Corbusier with the Plan Voisin, an expansion of the Garden city movement aimed at reducing the problem of urban congestion. It was introduced in several large cities across the world, notably in North America, Europe and Australia as a solution for housing, especially for public housing, reaching a peak of popularity in the 1960s with the introduction of prefabrication technology. The towers themselves are typically simple, brick or concrete-clad high-rise buildings with little ornamentation. The footprint was designed with simple geometry to minimise construction costs whilst maximising light, air, and views of the surrounding open space for occupants, sometimes including balconies for the apartments.

It is now generally seen as a failure in urban planning for the many problems it introduced in urban sociology including isolation and segregation from the wider community, a lack of privacy, as well as inefficiency in land-use planning. While it is increasingly popular in Asia, it has declined in the Western world. Many existing complexes, especially those government owned, are planned for demolition and redevelopment. Redevelopment of the complexes typically favour the antithesis of towers in the park ideology, mixed-use development, which is said to have more positive social outcomes including making people feel safer and more integrated with their community.

== History ==
Layout for Bijlmermeer, Amsterdam, 1965. Hexagonal tower grids and accessways were an attempt to improve the model's access to transportation.

Le Corbusier pioneered the "tower in a park" morphology in his unrealized 1923 Ville Contemporaine. Responding to the squalid conditions of cities in the 1920s, Le Corbusier proposed razing the old cities and replacing them with new, clean, hyper-rationalist layouts employing the "tower in a park" morphology. The skyscrapers were intended to house the new city's three million residents on only 5% of the land. By placing the buildings near the center of the block, there is room for parking, lawns, trees, and other landscaping elements. Le Corbusier further employed the morphology in his 1930 plan for Paris, the Ville Radieuse (also unrealized). Owing to the wide diffusion and influence of these two plans and their ideas post–World War II, especially the latter, the "tower in the park" morphology spread throughout Europe and North America.

== Criticism and current state ==
By the early 1970s, opposition to this style of towers mounted, with many, including urban planners, now referring to them as "ghettos". Neighbourhoods like St. James Town were originally designed to house young "swinging single" middle class residents, but the apartments lacked appeal and the area quickly became much poorer.

From its early days of implementation the concept was criticised for making residents feel unsafe, including large empty common areas dominated by gang culture and crime. The layout was criticised for normalising anti-social behaviour and hampering the efforts of essential services, particularly for law enforcement. Within less than a decade Sydney's 1960s public housing developments at Surry Hills, Redfern and Waterloo were labelled the "Suicide towers" due to their high rates.

Pruitt-Igoe in St. Louis, Missouri, was demolished in 1972 just a couple of decades after its construction due to deteriorating social conditions. Pruitt-Igoe's demolition became a major turning point in popularity of what was increasingly seen as a failed social experiment. Postmodern architectural historian Charles Jencks called its destruction "the day Modern architecture died" and considered it a direct indictment of the society-changing aspirations of the International school of architecture and an example of modernists' intentions running contrary to real-world social development.

By the mid 2000s, it became popular to reclaim the green space surrounding towers with lower buildings in an effort to increase density mix instead of segregate the land use.

== Examples ==
Some examples of the tower in a park morphology are below:

- Cooperative Village (1930–1959) in Lower East Side, New York City, New York
- Castle Village (1938–1939) in Hudson Heights, Manhattan, New York City, New York
- Vladeck Houses (1939–1940) in New York City, New York
- Parkchester (1939–1942) in New York City, New York
- Stuyvesant Town–Peter Cooper Village (1942–1947) in New York City, New York
- Riverton Houses (1947) in New York City, New York
- Unité d'habitation (1947–1952) in Marseille, France
- Morrisania, Bronx (1950–1980) in New York City, New York
- Pruitt–Igoe (1950–1955) in St. Louis, Missouri (demolished)
- Greenway Flats (1954) in Milsons Point, Sydney, Australia
- Wandana (1956) in Subiaco, Perth, Western Australia
- Cabrini–Green Homes (1957) in Chicago, Illinois (demolished)
- Park Hill (1957–1961) in Sheffield, England
- John Northcott Place (1961–1963) in Surry Hills, Sydney, Australia
- Rochdale Village (1961–1963) in Queens, New York City
- Debney Estate (1962-65) in Flemington, Melbourne (2 demolished from 2026 onwards and all to be demolished by 2051)
- LeFrak City (1962–1971) in Queens, New York
- Holland Estate (1963) in Kensington, Melbourne (1 Tower was demolished in 1999 and all to be demolished by 2051)
- Hotham Estate (1963) in North Melbourne, Melbourne (1 demolished from 2026 onwards and all to be demolished by 2051)
- Horace Petty Estate (1963) in South Yarra, Melbourne (1 earmarked for demolition by 2032)
- Aylesbury Estate (1963–1977) in South London, England (under demolition)
- Red Road Flats (1964–1968) in Glasgow, Scotland (demolished)
- Bijlmermeer (1965–1968) in Amsterdam, the Netherlands
- Co-op City, Bronx (1966–1973) in New York City
- Chalkhill Estate (1966–1970) in North London, England (demolished)
- Ballymun Flats (1966–1969) in Dublin, Ireland (demolished)
- Redfern Estate "Three Sisters" (1966) in Redfern, Sydney, Australia
- Rosebery Estate (1967) in Rosebery, Sydney Australia
- Stonebridge (1967) in London, England (demolished)
- Broadwater Farm (1967–1972) in London, England
- Collingwood Estate (1968 & 1971) in Collingwood, Melbourne (earmarked for demolition by 2051)
- Waterloo Estate (1968–1976) in Waterloo, Sydney, Australia
- Ferrier Estate (1968–1972) in South London (demolished)
- Richmond Estate (1969–1970) in Richmond, Melbourne (1 demolished from 2027 and all to be demolished by 2051)
- Brownlie Towers (1969–1970) in Bentley, Perth, Western Australia (demolished)
- Atherton Gardens (1970-71) in Fitzroy, Melbourne (earmarked for demolition by 2051)
- Heygate Estate (1971–1974) in South London (demolished)
- Sandburg Halls (1971–2001) in Milwaukee, Wisconsin
- Robin Hood Gardens (1972) in London (demolished)
- Trellick Tower (1972) in London
- Starrett City, Brooklyn (1974) in New York City, New York
- Alterlaa (1975–1986) in Vienna
- Sirius Building (1979–1980), The Rocks, Sydney (Refurbished into Private Housing)
- Bishan-Ang Mo Kio Park (1986–1988) in Singapore
