= Bird's foot =

Bird's foot may refer to:

- Bird feet and legs, part of the anatomy of birds
  - Dactyly in birds, the arrangement of the digits of a bird's foot
- Plaquemines-Balize delta or Bird's Foot Delta, part of the Mississippi River Delta

== Plants ==
- Ornithopus or bird's-foot, a genus of flowering plants
- Cardamine concatenata, bird's foot toothwort
- Eleusine indica, bird's foot grass
- Viola pedata, bird's foot violet
- Ranunculus pedatifidus, birdfoot buttercup
- Birdsfoot trefoil, Lotus corniculatus
- Birdfoot sagebrush, Artemisia pedatifida
- Bird's foot cranesbill, various species in the genus Geranium
- Various species in the genus Erodium

== See also ==
- Bird's Fort, Texas
- Chicken claw (disambiguation)
- Chicken foot (disambiguation)
- Crow foot (disambiguation)
- Eagle claw (disambiguation)
- Goose foot (disambiguation)
