= Ville Radieuse =

Unrealised project by Le Corbusier

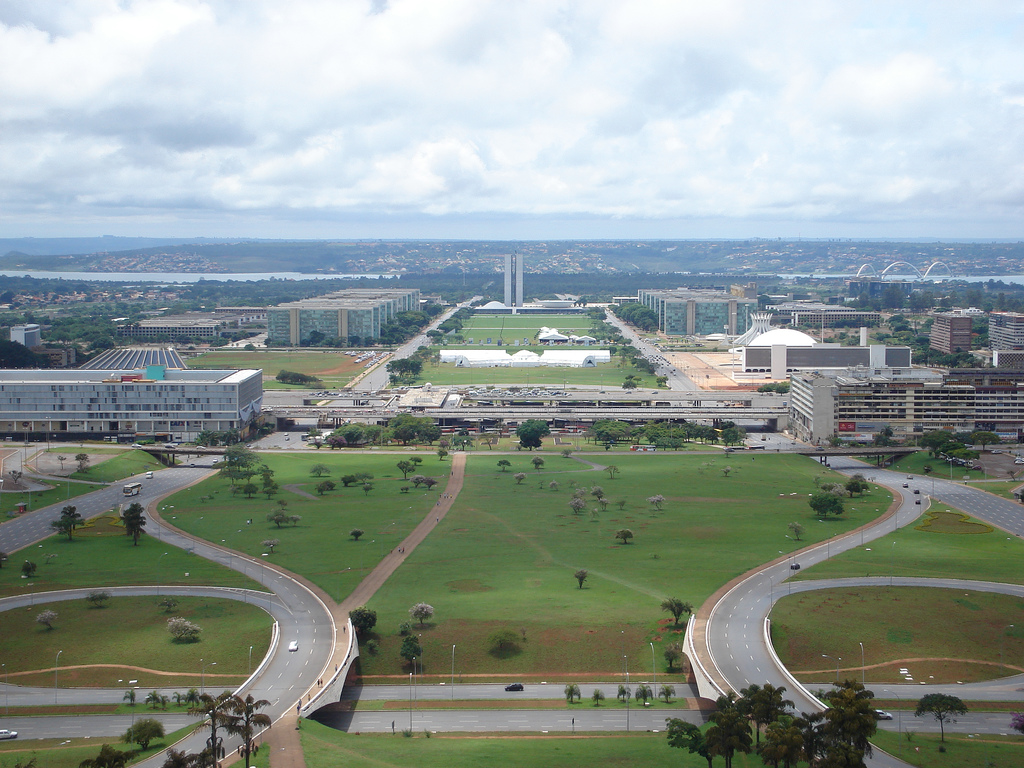
Design of Brasília – based upon the principles of the Ville radieuse

Ville radieuse (French pronunciation: [vil ʁaˈdjøːz]; lit. 'Radiant City') was an unrealised urban design project designed by the French-Swiss architect Le Corbusier in 1930. It constitutes one of the most influential and controversial urban design doctrines of European modernism.

Although Le Corbusier had exhibited his ideas for the ideal city, the Ville contemporaine, in the 1920s, during contact with international planners he began work on the Ville Radieuse. In 1930 he had become an active member of the syndicalist movement and proposed the Ville radieuse as a blueprint of social reform.

The principles of the Ville radieuse were incorporated into his later publication, the Athens Charter published in 1933.

His utopian ideal formed the basis of a number of urban plans during the 1930s and 1940s culminating in the design and construction of the first Unité d'habitation in Marseille in 1952.

== Development ==
In the late 1920s Le Corbusier lost confidence in big business to realise his dreams of utopia represented in the Ville Contemporaine and Plan Voisin (1925). Influenced by the linear city ideas of Arturo Soria y Mata (which Milyutin also employed) and the theories of the syndicalist movement (that he had recently joined) he formulated a new vision of the ideal city, the Ville Radieuse. It represented a utopian dream to reunite man within a well-ordered environment. Unlike the radial design of the Ville Contemporaine, the Ville Radieuse was a linear city based upon the abstract shape of the human body with head, spine, arms and legs. The design maintained the idea of high-rise housing blocks, free circulation and abundant green spaces proposed in his earlier work. The blocks of housing were laid out in long lines stepping in and out. Like the Swiss Pavilion they were glazed on their south side and were raised up on pilotis. They had roof terraces and running tracks on their roofs.

The Ville Radieuse also made reference to Corbusier's work in Russia. In 1930, he wrote a 59-page Reply to Moscow when commenting upon a competition in Moscow. The report contained drawings defining an alternative urban model for the planning of the city. He exhibited the first representations of his ideas at the third CIAM meeting in Brussels in 1930 (although he withdrew the Moscow proposals). In addition he developed proposals for the Ferme Radieuse (Radiant Farm) and Village Radieux (Radiant Village).

== Spread ==
Throughout the thirties Le Corbusier spread the message of his new, ideal city. Discussions at the fourth CIAM meeting on board the SS Patris bound for Athens were incorporated into Corbusier's book, The Radiant City (published in 1933). This in turn influenced the Athens Charter.

Between 1931 and 1940 Corbusier undertook a series of town planning proposals for Algiers. During that period Algiers was the administrative capital of French North Africa. Although he was not officially invited to submit proposals for the city, he knew the mayor was interested so he tried his luck. The plan had to incorporate the existing casbah whilst allowing for the linear growth of the increasing population. The resulting Obus Plan was a variation on the Ville Radieuse, adapted for a very specific culture and landscape. It comprised four main elements: an administration area by the water in two slab blocks, convex and concave apartment blocks for the middle classes up on the slopes above the city, an elevated roadway on a north–south axis above the casbah and a meandering viaduct with a road on top meandering down the coast.

In 1933 in Nemours, North Africa he proposed eighteen Unité apartment blocks orientated north–south against a backdrop of mountains.

On his 1935 trip to the United States, Corbusier criticised the skyscrapers of Manhattan for being too small and too close together. He proposed replacing all the existing buildings with one huge Cartesian Skyscraper equipped with living and working units. This would have cleared the way for more parkland, thus conforming to the ideals of the Ville Radieuse.

Even as late as the 1940s he was trying to court both Mussolini and the Vichy government to adopt his ideal city plans. Corbusier's best opportunity for the realisation of his plans were the designs for Chandigarh, India, which he developed in 1949.

From 1945 to 1952 he undertook the design and construction of the Unité d'Habitation in Marseilles. The Unité embodied the ideas of the Ville Radieuse that he had developed in Nemours and Algiers.

When designing the layout for Brasília, architects Lúcio Costa and Oscar Niemeyer were influenced by the plans for the Ville Radieuse.

== Criticism ==
New Urbanists such as James Howard Kunstler criticise the Ville Radieuse concept for its lack of human scale and connection to its surroundings. It is, in Lewis Mumford's phrase, "buildings in a parking lot." "The space between the high-rises floating in a superblock became instant wastelands, shunned by the public."

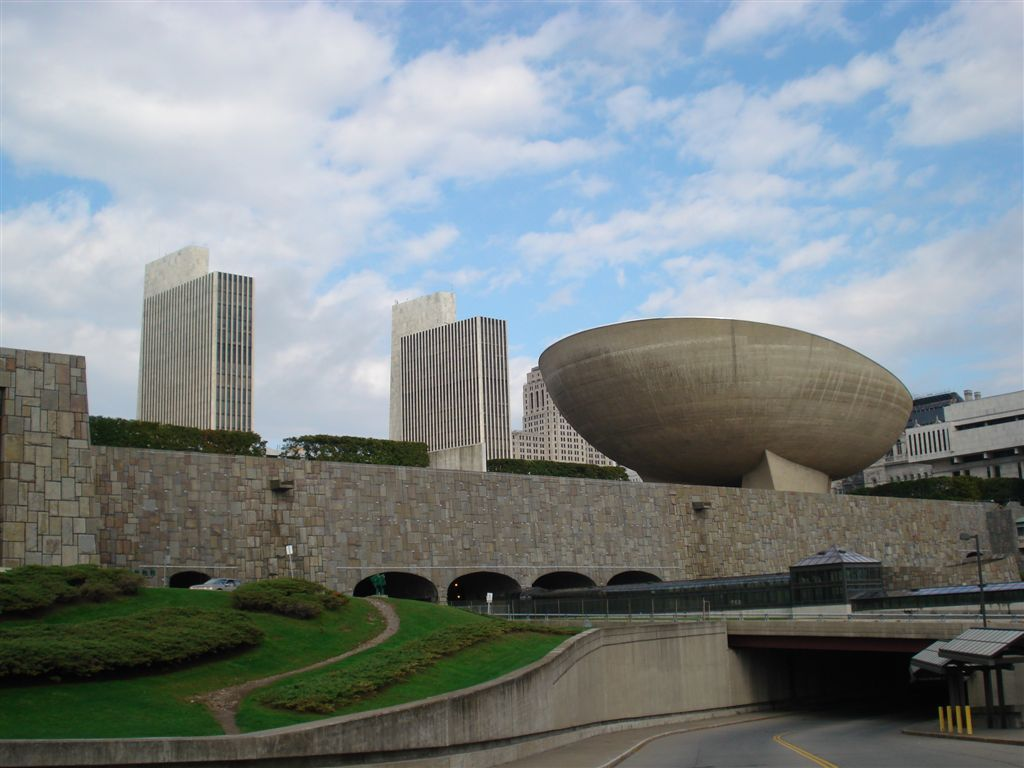
Empire State Plaza, Albany, New York

The Empire State Plaza, a complex of state office buildings in Albany, New York, has been criticized for its adherence to the concept. Architecture critic Martin Filler, quoted in The Making Of Empire State Plaza, says

There is no relationship at all between buildings and site, neither at grade nor atop the podium, since all vestiges of the existing site have been so totally obliterated. Thus, as one stands on the Plaza itself, there is an eerie feeling of detachment. The Mall buildings loom menacingly, like aliens from another galaxy set down on this marble landing strip

== See also ==
- Compact city
- Spoke–hub distribution paradigm
- Urban density
- Urban sprawl
