= Anserinus =

Anserinus may refer to:

- A biological word meaning 'goose-like'
- Pes anserinus (disambiguation), anatomical term meaning "goose footed"
