= Athens Charter =

1942 urban planning book

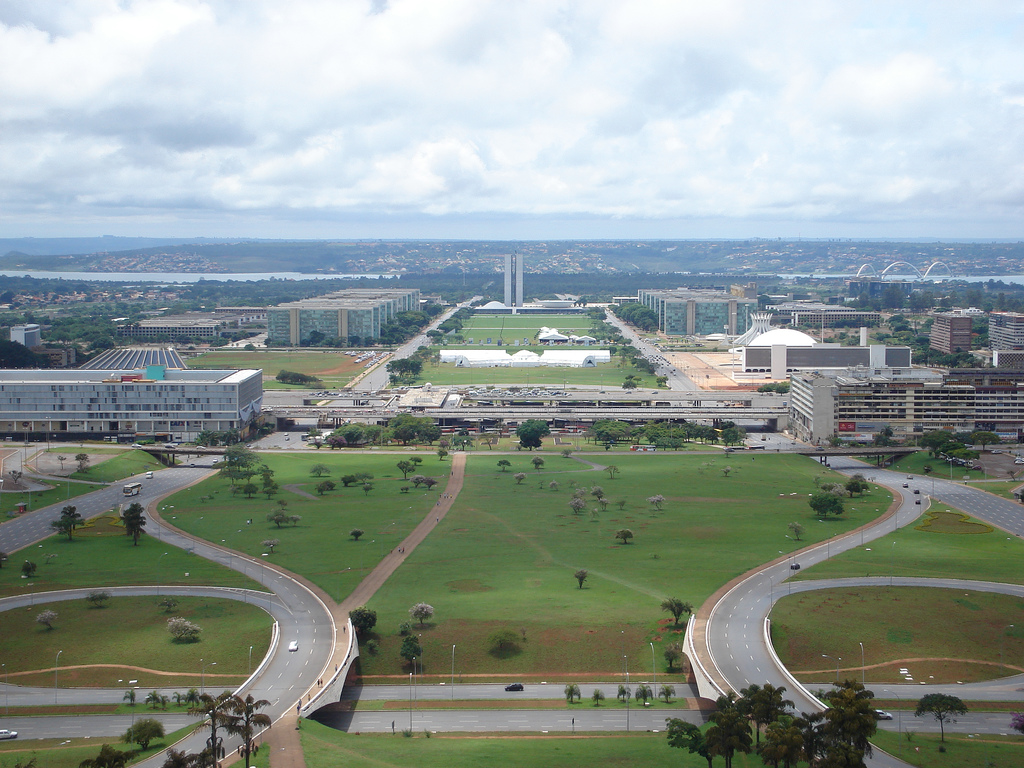
Design of Brasília – influenced by The Athens Charter

The Athens Charter (French: Charte d'Athènes, Greek: Χάρτα των Αθηνών) is a 1942 book about urban planning published by the Swiss architect Le Corbusier. The work was based upon Le Corbusier’s Ville Radieuse (Radiant City) book of 1933 and urban studies undertaken by the Congrès International d'Architecture Moderne (CIAM) in the early 1930s.

The Charter got its name from location of the fourth CIAM conference in 1933, which took place on the S.S. Patris bound for Athens from Marseille. This conference is documented in Architects' Congress, a film commissioned by Sigfried Giedion and made by his friend László Moholy-Nagy.

The Charter had a significant impact on urban planning after World War II.

== Background ==
Although Le Corbusier had exhibited his ideas for the ideal city, the Ville Contemporaine in the 1920s, during the early 1930s, after contact with international planners he began work on the Ville Radieuse (Radiant City). In 1930 he had become an active member of the syndicalist movement and proposed the Ville Radieuse as a blueprint of social reform.

Unlike the radial design of the Ville Contemporaine, the Ville Radieuse was a linear city based upon the abstract shape of the human body with head, spine, arms and legs. The design maintained the idea of high-rise housing blocks, free circulation and abundant green spaces proposed in his earlier work. Le Corbusier exhibited the first representations of his ideas at the third CIAM meeting in Brussels in 1930 and published a book of the same title as the city in 1935.

== The Functional City ==
The concept of the Functional City came to dominate CIAM thinking after the conference in Brussels. At a meeting in Zürich in 1931, CIAM members Le Corbusier, Walter Gropius, Siegfried Giedion, Rudolf Steiger and Werner M. Moser discussed with Cornelis van Eesteren the importance of solar orientation in governing the directional positioning of low-cost housing on a given site. Van Eesteren had been chief architect of Amsterdam's Urban Development Section since 1929 and the group asked him to prepare a number of analytical studies of cities ready for the next main CIAM meeting planned to be in Moscow in 1933. The theme for these studies would be the Functional City, that is, one where land planning would be based upon function-based zones.

Van Eesteren employed the city planner Theodor Karel van Lohuizen to use methods developed for the Amsterdam Expansion Plan, to prepare zoning plans that would predict overall future development in the city. He relied upon the more rational methods being promoted by CIAM at that time which sought to use statistical information for designing zone uses rather than designing them in any detail.

At a special congress meeting in Berlin later in 1931 van Eesteren presented his findings to his colleagues. He presented three drawings of Amsterdam. The first at a scale of 1:10000 showed land use and density, the second showed transportation networks and the third, at 1:50000 showed the regional setting of the city. He also presented supporting information on the four functions of dwelling, work, recreation and transport. Based upon his presentation it was decided that the separate national groups within CIAM would prepare similar presentation boards for the Moscow meeting. A standard set of notation was agreed.

In 1932 Le Corbusier's Palace of the Soviets competition entry failed to gain acceptance from the jury and, due to the political conditions in Russia, CIAM's agenda became increasingly ignored. A new venue for the fourth CIAM conference was required.

== CIAM 4 ==
The fourth CIAM conference took place on board the S.S. Patris, an ocean-going liner journeying from Marseilles to Athens in July 1933.

The national groups reported to the conference with the findings from their city studies, presenting in each case the agreed three boards showing a total of 33 cities. In addition, Le Corbusier and the group who had met earlier in Zürich hosted a meeting to state the core goals of the Functional City.

On arrival in Athens on 3 August an exhibition of the Functional City boards was held at the National Technical University of Athens and inaugurated by Greece's prime minister. The boards were separated into seven categories: metropolises, cities of administration, ports, industrial cities, pleasure cities and cities of diverse function. The delegates remained in Athens for a number of days, some visited local classical sites and others visited nearby islands. On 10 August they embarked on the return journey to Marseilles.

During meetings on the return journey delegates found it impossible to agree on resolutions for the Functional City. Van Eesteren's original Amsterdam plan had, with greater resources, a basis formed by scientific data. The plans presented by the national groups did not have this and, despite Giedion's insistence, delegates were reluctant to agree on guidelines. Eventually, two groups agreed on two separate texts: observations and resolutions.

== The Athens Charter ==
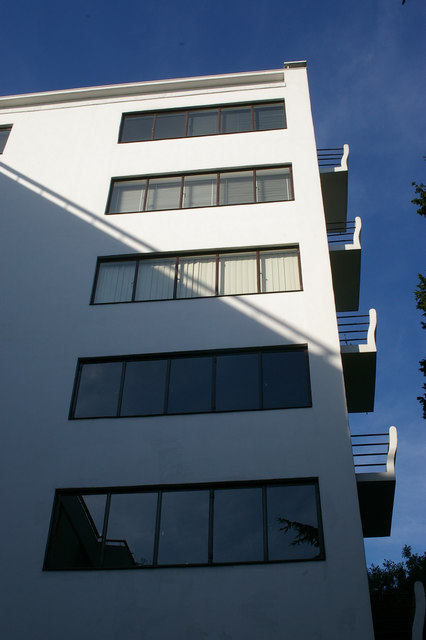
Highpoint 1 by Berthold Lubetkin

The observations taken from the studies of 33 cities set guidelines under the titles: living, working, recreation and circulation.

CIAM demanded that housing districts should occupy the best sites, and a minimum amount of solar exposure should be required in all dwellings. For hygienic reasons, buildings should not be built along transportation routes, and modern techniques should be used to construct high apartment building spaces widely apart, to free the soil for large green parks.

-Mumford, 2000, The CIAM Discourse on Urbanism, 1928-1960, The MIT Press, p85

Additionally they said it was important to reduce commuting times by locating industrial zones close to residential ones and buffering them with wide parks and sports areas. Street widths and requirements should be scientifically worked out to accommodate the speed and type of transport. Finally, with regards to conservation, historic monuments should be kept only when they were of true value and their conservation did not reduce their inhabitants to unhealthy living conditions.

The observations formed the basis of Josep Lluís Sert's book Can our cities survive? and were incorporated in Le Corbusier's Athens Charter published in 1943. The resolutions formed part of Le Corbusier's book The Radiant City published in 1935.

The text of the Athens Charter as published became an extension of the content of The Radiant City and Le Corbusier significantly re-worded the original observations. As well as adding new material he also removed the urban plans upon which the original text was based. This treatment made the Athens Charter an abstract text of general value but also transformed the original force of the observations that were founded before on concrete references. Despite its title, the Athens Charter cannot be considered as the mutual outcome of the CIAM conference, which took place ten years earlier, but largely as an expression of Le Corbusier's individual concerns.

== Pre-war influence ==
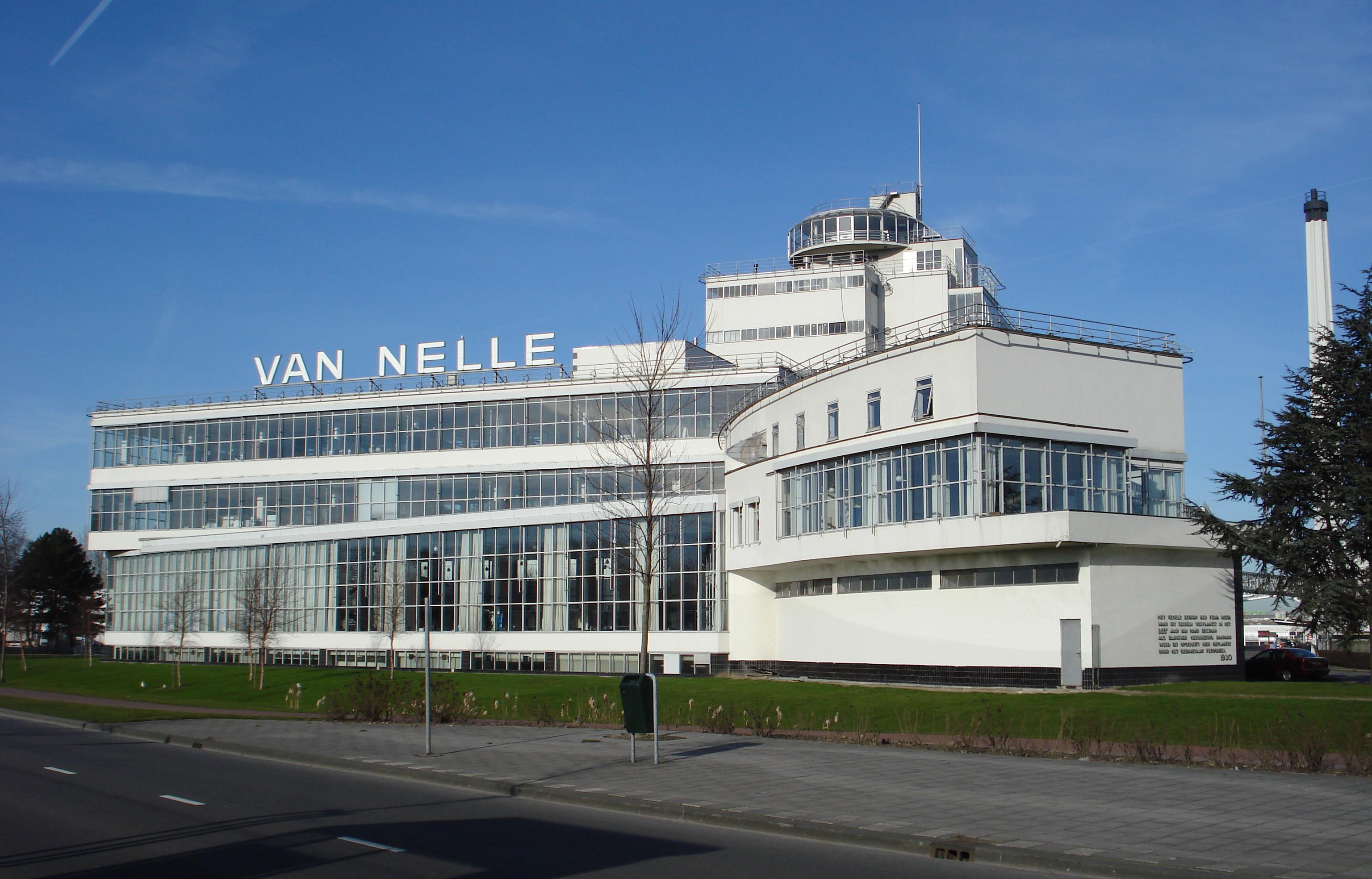
Van Nelle Factory, Netherlands

The CIAM 4 meeting was influential among attending architects from Switzerland, France, England, Germany, Austria, Belgium, Hungary, the Netherlands, Italy, Spain, Greece, Finland, Denmark, Norway, Poland, Czechoslovakia, Yugoslavia, Brazil and Canada.

After The Radiant City was published in France in 1935, Le Corbusier continued to develop his ideas of urban planning through a number of unrealised schemes. These included plans for Antwerp, Paris, Moscow, Algiers and Morocco.

In the Netherlands, CIAM delegates visited the Van Nelle factory designed in part by Mart Stam that was to have formed a larger part of a Functional City design.

CIAM 4 was the first congress that the influential MARS Group from England was represented. In 1935 MARS member Berthold Lubetkin and his practice, the Tecton Group completed Highpoint in Highgate, London. The project comprised 56 dwellings grouped together as two crosses on plan, eight dwellings per arm. Each dwelling is linked to a central service core but is separated from its neighbour by a balcony - a design feature that virtually eliminated noise transfer between dwellings.

In 1937 with the fall of the Second Spanish Republic, Sert suggested that England and the United States may be the best place to focus CIAM's activities.

== Post-war influence ==
The Athens Charter had a huge impact on planning thought after World War II. However, its influence was more complicated because in the 1950s CIAM attempted to replace the Functional City described in the Charter with a different Charter of Habitat.

=== France ===
In 1946 Le Corbusier received a commission for projects in La Rochelle and St Dié. The urban plan allowed him to experiment with urban monumentality that had been somewhat underplayed in the Charter, but as part of the project he proposed eight Unité d'Habitation flanked by a civic centre. Although these proposals were unbuilt, he had more success in Marseilles where an initial study for three Unités resulted in one being built. In line with the Charter, the Unité was a north-south orientated block eighteen storeys high set in parkland. There is a public 'street' on levels 7 and 8 that provides various shops, offices and a hotel. On the roof there is a nursery school, a running track and a pool. It opened in 1952 but had begun to influence architects even before it was complete.

=== United Kingdom ===
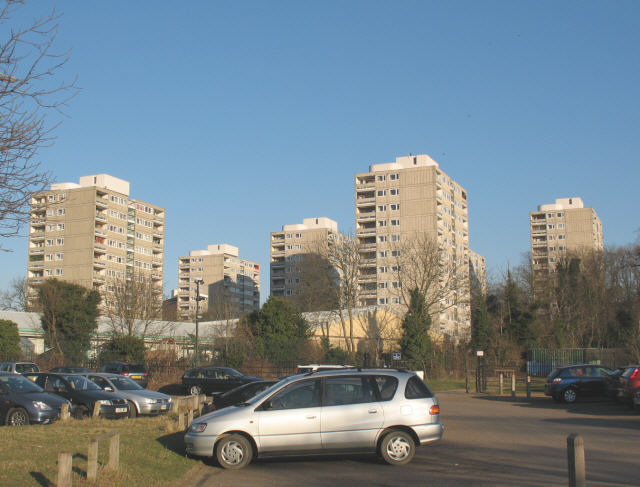
High rises part of the Alton Estate

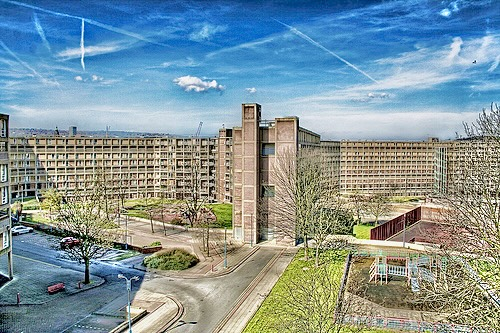
Parkhill Estate, Sheffield

The 1949 Housing Act in England paved the way for Local Authorities to provide a balance of housing types for a range of communities, not just the working class. In the socialist post-war atmosphere, architectural writer J M Richards praised Le Corbusier's Unité for "putting clean and healthy housing in a parkland setting".

Between 1952 and 1958 London County Council built the Alton East and Alton West high-rise blocks in Roehampton. Alton East comprised 744 dwellings within mainly 10-storey blocks and Alton West was 1867 dwellings in 5-, 6- and 12-storey blocks. Both projects are set within parkland and have since been listed.

In Sheffield in 1958, the city architect, Lewis Womersley, designed the Park Hill Estate. The product of an entire slum clearance, three times the size of the Unité, dwellings were housed in a series of high-rise structures connected by external decks. These 'streets in the air' are wide enough to incorporate bicycles and milk floats. Initial success came because whole streets were moved into adjacent dwellings on the new scheme. Harold Macmillan said it would "draw the admiration of the world".

In Scotland, the Department of Housing for Scotland encouraged Local Authorities to build more unified and open schemes. The Functional City prescribed the separation of industrial zones from residential ones by parkland. This concept suited the regeneration of industrial decay in Scottish cities. From 1956 the Hutchesontown Gorbals area of Glasgow was redeveloped. The architect Robert Matthew designed one of the four areas using 18-storey blocks on a north-south axis that ignored local street patterns.

The Golden Lane Estate in London was designed by Chamberlin, Powell and Bon, who also designed the adjacent Barbican Estate. It has a variety of dwellings and a good provision of supporting community buildings. Like the Unité it has a terrace on the roof.

The Smithsons (Alison and Peter Smithson) were against the four functions explored for the Functional City, renaming them House, Street, District and City. In the Golden Lane development the House became the family unit, the Street was an elevated access deck but the District and City lay outside the project's boundaries. Their work was never built at Golden Lane, but these ideas can be viewed in their book "Urban Structuring".

=== The Americas ===
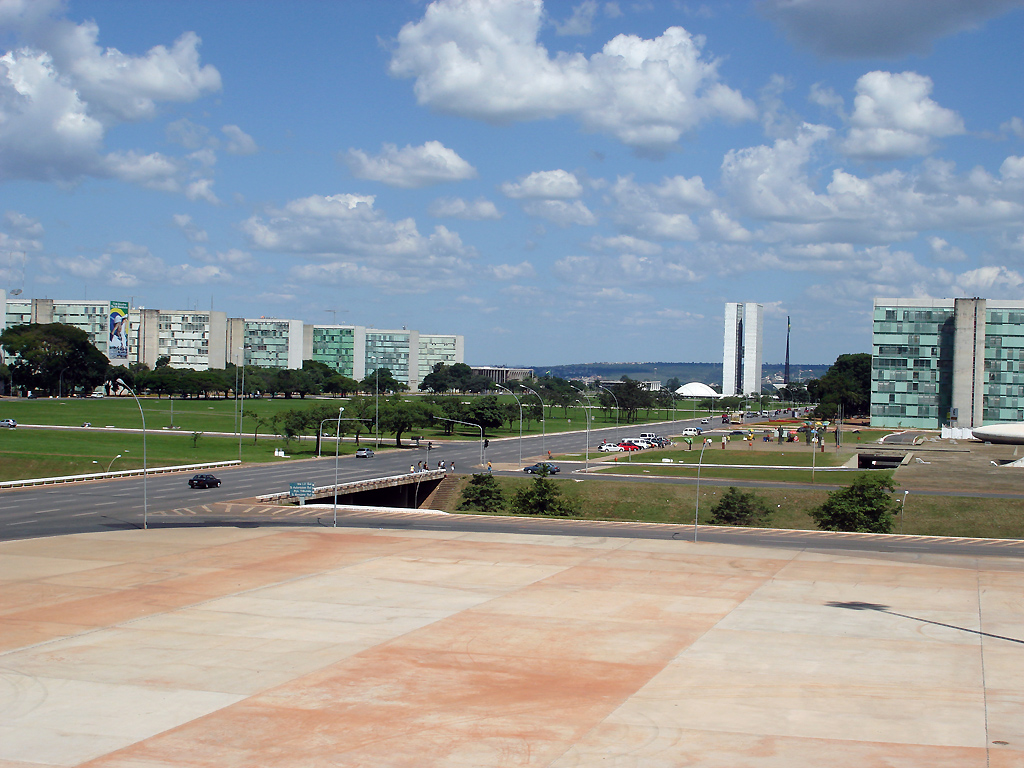
Ministers Esplanade in Brasília

Lúcio Costa's conception of the plan for Brasília saw the city as a manifestation of the Functional City. Like Le Corbusier's Ville Radieuse, it was seen as a method of imposing order, progress and stability to Brazil's new capital. Like Le Corbusier, Costa and Oscar Niemeyer aspired to produce a city based upon equality and justice.

In a variation of the Functional City, Sert designed married-student housing for Harvard University in 1964. Known as Peabody Terraces it was made up of three main towers set in lawns and sheltered pedestrian routes. It avoided the usual vacuum at the base by grading the scale between the towers and the lawns.

=== The rest of the world ===
In Japan in 1957, Kunio Maekawa designed the Harumi Apartment block in Tokyo based upon the idea of the Unité. Meanwhile, In Tel Aviv in 1963 CIAM member Jacob B. Bakema designed a Functional City proposal based upon Le Corbusier's Algiers scheme.

== Criticism ==
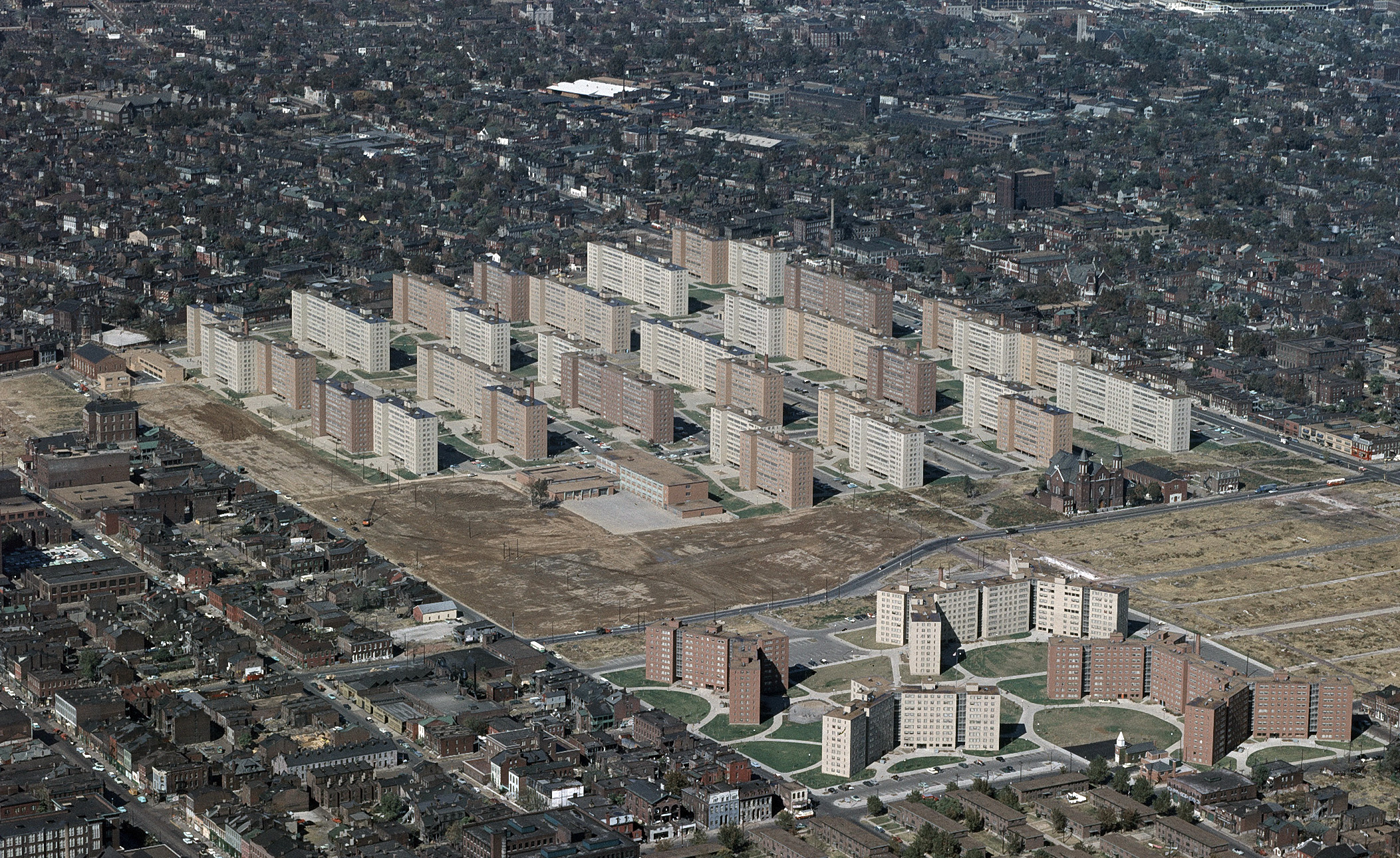
Pruitt–Igoe housing scheme in St Louis, Missouri

The Pruitt–Igoe housing scheme in St Louis, Missouri was designed in accordance with CIAM ideals for the Functional City. It was made up of 14 storey blocks and is often claimed to have won an American Institute of Architects award when it was built in 1951, but no evidence of such exists. Charles Jencks proclaimed that the death of Modern Architecture was on 15 July 1972 at 3.32pm when the Pruitt–Igoe housing scheme was demolished with dynamite.

Architectural critic Reyner Banham was concerned that the supposed universality of the Charter concealed a very narrow view of architecture and planning that overly constrained the members of CIAM. The emphasis on tall high-density housing amongst wide, green spaces effectively killed research into other areas of urban housing.

In planning terms the Charter had set rigid geometries for urban planning, increasingly there became an awareness of words like 'neighbourhood', 'cluster' and 'association' that demanded a more organic approach to the image of the city.

Even by 1954 during the Aix-en-Provence meeting of CIAM the younger generation riled against the pre-war utopian ideals that the Charter represented. This disillusionment would lead to the formation of Team X at the Dubrovnik meeting of CIAM that would eventually lead to the breakup of the Conference as an organisation.

In the case of Brasília, whilst Niemeyer remained faithful to the ideas of zoning and green spaces, his revised urban utopia became based upon a smaller city with a high vertical concentration of people with increased pedestrian facilities. In 1958 he had warned that his utopian dream could not be fulfilled unless society itself was reorganised to suit it. At its inauguration the city was branded a Kafkaesque Nightmare with an Orwellian environment.

To reduce the matter to high density when no due attention was given to communal facilities was to court disaster; to create open space without greenery was to devalue the idea of the community living in nature. The imitations of the Unité usually involved such drastic omissions. Does this mean that the prototype should be blamed for the later disastrous variations?

−Curtis, 1986, Modern Architecture since 1900, Phaidon, p293

== Recent history ==
In 2003 the European Council of Spatial Planners wrote a new version of the Charter.

== Trivia ==
J. G. Ballard's book High Rise is set in a 40 storey block set in parkland with other high-rises in central London. On the tenth floor is a wide concourse with supermarket, shops and gymnasium and a swimming pool. On the 35th floor there is a smaller swimming pool, a sauna and a restaurant. As the affluent tenants embark upon an orgy of destruction, Ballard tells the story of how the whole block slowly degenerates into chaos.
