= Eagle claw (disambiguation) =

Eagle claw may refer to:

- The claw of an eagle
- Eagle Claw, a style of Chinese martial arts
- Operation Eagle Claw, a 1980 U.S. military rescue operation during the Iran hostage crisis
- A service, dubbed “Eagle Claw”, run by Nigeria’s Economic and Financial Crimes Commission and using technology developed by Microsoft to track down fraudulent emails, and capable of warning a quarter of a million potential victims of Nigerian scams.
- Operation Eagle Claw XI, a 2007 military operation in the Iraq War
- Aetonyx, a Jurassic dinosaur whose name derives from the Greek word for “eagle claw”

== See also ==
- Bird's foot (disambiguation)
- Chicken claw (disambiguation)
- Claw (disambiguation)
- Eagle (disambiguation)
- Eagles Claw (disambiguation)
