= Plan Voisin =

Urbanism plan for Paris, by Le Corbusier

Coordinates: 48.86943°N 2.35413°E

The Plan Voisin was a planned redevelopment of Paris designed by French-Swiss architect Le Corbusier in 1925. The redevelopment was planned to replace a large area of central Paris, on the Right Bank of the River Seine. Although it was never implemented, the project is one of Le Corbusier's most well known; its principles inspired a number of other plans around the world.

== Background ==
=== Ville Contemporaine ===
In 1922, Le Corbusier presented Ville Contemporaine at Salon d'Automne; the plan was a utopian urban concept intended to house three million inhabitants in a series of skyscrapers. Following the exhibition, Le Corbusier continued work on the project, developing the plan from a non site-specific concept to a concrete proposal. This proposal was sponsored by his friend, the avant garde aircraft and automobile builder Gabriel Voisin, whose cutting-edge design aesthetic was admired by Le Corbusier.

=== Motivation ===
Le Corbusier's motivation to develop the Plan Voisin was founded in frustrations with the urban design of Paris.

While upper class citizens of many urban areas relocated to suburbs, the bourgeois residents of late 19th century Paris largely remained in the city center. Pushed out by rising land prices, poorer Parisians left for shanty towns on the city's outskirts. Economic segregation was exacerbated by Georges Haussmann's renovation of the city which separated affluent and poor neighborhoods with wide avenues.

Within Paris' poorer neighborhoods, severe disease – worsened by poor sanitation – was rampant. Tuberculosis, in particular, was highly concentrated within the city's slums.

== Characteristics ==
The Plan Voisin consisted of 18 identical skyscrapers, which were spread out evenly over an open plain of roads and parks. These skyscrapers would have adhered to the Le Corbusian model of the unité d'habitation, a comprehensive living and working space, and an early inspiration for brutalism. The development could accommodate 78,000 residents over an area of 260 hectares. In stark contrast to the dense urban area that the plan intended to replace, only 12% of the area of Plan Voisin was to be built-up. Of the built-up area, 49% was partitioned for residential use, while the other 51% accounted for all other uses of the space. Roughly a third of the open area was reserved for vehicle use, while the rest was pedestrian-only.

Le Corbusier developed his proposal for Plan Voisin in this way in explicit contrast to dense urban areas such as Downtown New York City, which he described as a "nightmare". The proposal called for wider roads to accommodate for automobile traffic, and to lessen the burden that horse-drawn carriages had on automobiles. These roads would be paired with tree-lined pedestrian walkways, which would be surrounded by the skyscrapers in the open air above the tree line. These walkways would lead gradually to the buildings, which contained ground-floor cafés, shops, and offices. The residential spaces in the above floors were described as "dormitories".

== Rejection and legacy ==
=== Rejection ===
Ultimately, Plan Voisin was rejected by the city of Paris, as it was seen to be too radical. While it is unclear if the general public supported the plan, Le Corbusier did promote his ideas through manifestos and periodicals, which were widely read by industrialists and the avant-garde of the time. Additionally, Le Corbusier would showcase his plans at international expositions, spreading the influence of the plan's principles around the world.

=== Legacy ===
The Plan Voisin was the first of Le Corbusier's proposals, and its principles were paramount in the spread of modernist urbanism around the world. Particularly, the openness and relative sparseness of built-up area proposed in the plan and the use of residential towers were practices that were replicated in many places. La Cité de la Muette was built in Drancy – a suburb of Paris – closely mimicking the design techniques of Plan Voisin. The complex was used as a concentration camp from 1941 to 1944, from where over 67,000 Jews were sent directly to Auschwitz.

Additionally, the La Défense business district of Paris drew inspiration from Plan Voisin, with its concrete slab foundation a notably similar feature to Le Corbusier's plan.

These plans arose in the context of the post-war construction boom in Europe, lasting roughly between 1945 and 1980. During this period, urban development was rapidly spurred on by rural-to-urban migration and immigration from former colonies. The simplicity and high capacity of modernist residential towers made them suitable for this rapid development, and are commonplace in many Parisian suburbs as a result. These principles were summarized in the Athens Charter of 1947, which acted as a treatise for functional, modernist urban planning.

Internationally, many plans were influenced by Plan Voisin and Athens Charter. The plan had significant influence in the purpose-built Brazilian capital of Brasília as well as the Lekkumerend housing in Leeuwarden, Netherlands, which drew inspiration from the principles of the Athens Charter. By the 1990s, the Lekkumerend quarter was a byword for criminality and poverty, and most of the original Corbusier-inspired buildings have been demolished in an effort to improve living conditions. The unpopular name Lekkumerend was changed to 'Vrijheidswijk'.
