= Hook sword =

Chinese curved sword

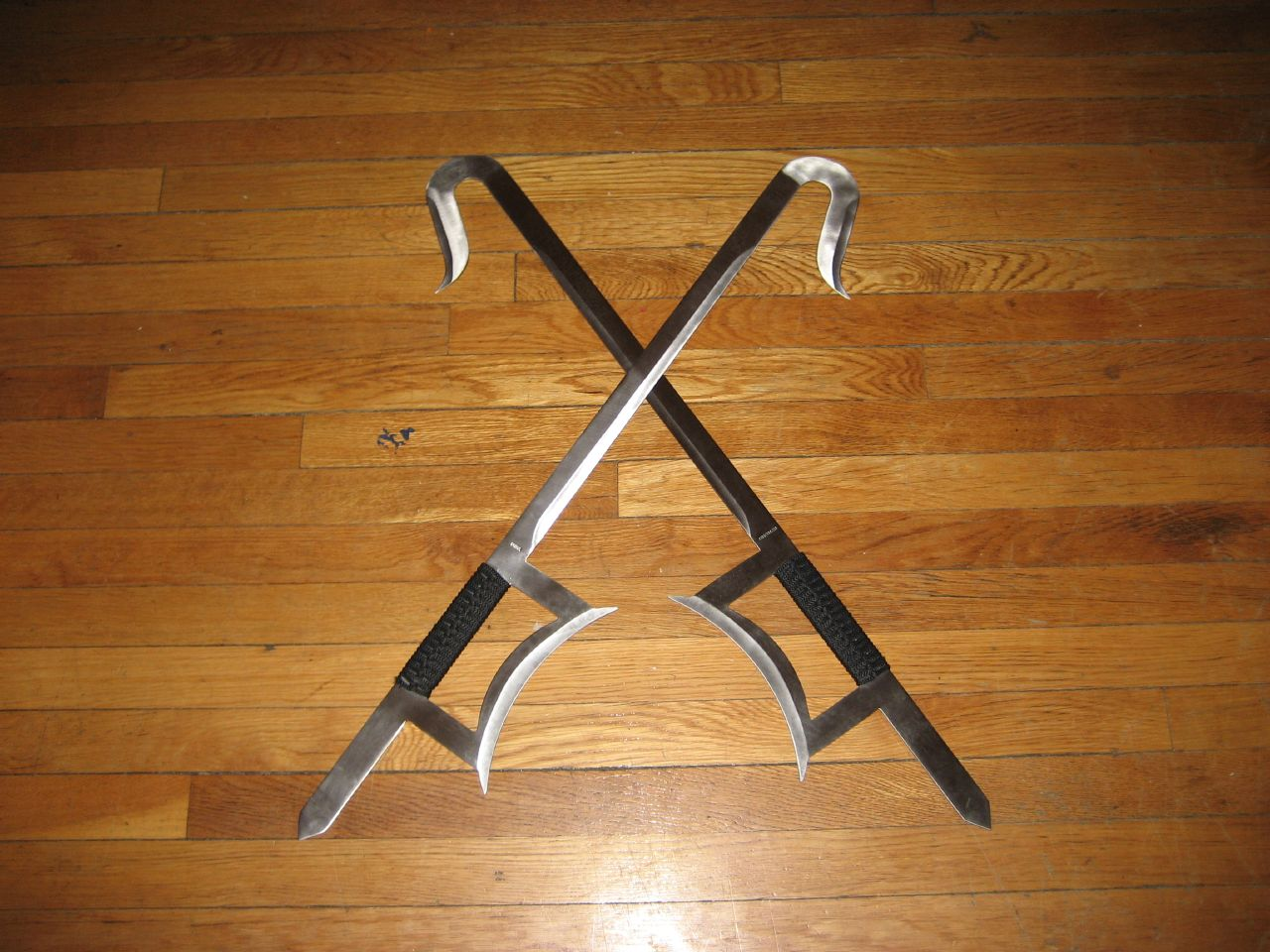
Hook swords, typically used as a pair.

The hook sword, twin hooks, fu tao, hu tou gou (tiger head hook) or shuang gou (Chinese: 鈎 or 鉤; pinyin: Gōu) is a Chinese weapon traditionally associated with northern styles of Chinese martial arts and Wushu weapons routines; however, it is now often used in southern styles as well.

== Background ==
Reliable information on hook swords is difficult to come by. While sometimes called an ancient weapon and described as dating from the Song dynasty to Warring States or even earlier, most antique examples and artistic depictions are from the late Qing era or later, suggesting that they are actually a comparatively recent design. They were also an exclusively civilian weapon, appearing in none of the official listings of Chinese armaments. Surviving sharpened examples point to actual use as weapons, but their rarity, and the training necessary to use them, strongly suggest that they were only rarely used as such.

== Characteristics ==
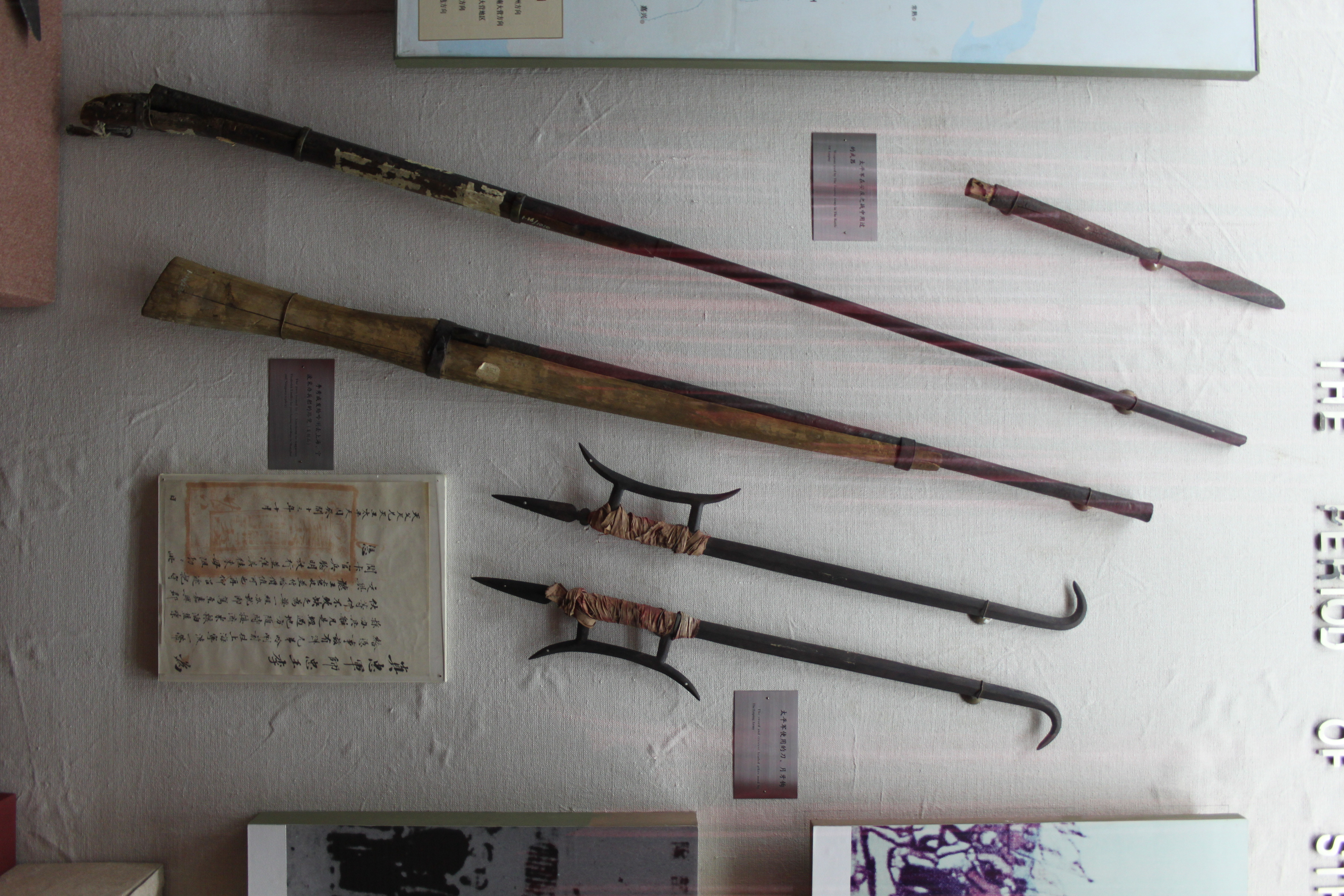
Hook sword (middle) used by the Taiping Army

Also known as "tiger hook swords" or qian kun ri yue dao (literally "Heaven and Earth, Sun and Moon sword"), these weapons have a sharp blade similar to the jian, although possibly thicker or sometimes unsharpened, with a prong or hook (similar to a shepherd's crook) near the tip. The guards are substantial, in the style of butterfly swords. Often used in pairs, the hooks of the weapons may be used to trap or deflect other weapons.

There are five components to the hook sword:

- The back, which is often used as a regular sword.
- The hook, which is used to trip enemies, catch weapons and for slashing.
- The end of the hilt, which is sharpened.
- The crescent guard, which is used for blocking, trapping and slashing.
- The link, which is used when using a pair. The two hooks can loosely connect, and the wielder swings one hook sword, in a way that the second is extended further out, almost six feet. While the second is in the air, the dagger upon the hilt slashes the target. In this way, the wielder can extend their reach out from three feet to six.

== Use ==
Routines for hook swords are taught in such northern schools as Northern Shaolin and Seven-Star Mantis, and in some schools of southern arts such as Choy Lay Fut. Modern routines for hook swords are often very flashy, and may involve techniques such as linking paired weapons and wielding them as a single long, flexible weapon. Most routines are single person. Some schools of Baguazhang also teach a similar weapon, often called "deer horn knives" or "Mandarin duck knives." These weapons typically feature a much shorter or entirely missing main hook, and instead focus on the various cutting and stabbing blades arranged around the guard. Because of the various protrusions and the high possibility for accidental hooking or stabbing, they are almost never used in sparring, and are used sparingly in two person routines.

== See also ==
- Aruval
- Chicken sickles

== Bibliography ==
- Kennedy, Brian; Guo, Elizabeth (2005). Chinese Martial Arts Training Manuals: A Historical Survey. Berkeley: North Atlantic Books. ISBN 978-1-55643-557-7.
- Lee, Kam Wing (1985). The Secret of Seven-Star Mantis Style. Hong Kong: Lee Kam Wing Martial Art Sports Association.
