= Eagles Claw =

Eagles Claw or Eagle's Claw may refer to:

- Eagle's Claw, 1978 Chinese language martial arts film made in Hong Kong
- Eagle's Claw (Lightwater Valley), amusement ride in Yorkshire, UK
- Eagles Claw Nature Reserve, NSW, Australia

== See also ==
- Eagle claw (disambiguation)
