= Chicken foot (disambiguation) =

Chicken foot or chicken feet may refer to:

- Chicken feet, a regional delicacy in many parts of the world
- Chicken foot (game), a domino game of the "Trains" family
- Chickenfoot, an American agro/hard rock
  - Chickenfoot (album), that group's debut album

== See also ==
- Chicken claw (disambiguation)
- Crow foot (disambiguation)
- Bird's foot (disambiguation)
