= Crow foot =

Crow foot, crow's foot, crow's feet or crowfoot may refer to:

== People ==
- Crowfoot (surname)
- Crowfoot (1830–1890), First Nations chief, of the Blackfoot
- Crow Foot (1873–1890), Native American of the Sioux

== Places ==
- Crowfoot, New Jersey, an unincorporated community, US

=== Canada ===
- Crowfoot Mountain (Alberta), Canadian Rockies, Alberta
  - Crowfoot Glacier
- Crowfoot (electoral district), former electoral district in Alberta
  - Replaced by Battle River—Crowfoot electoral district, in 2012
- Crowfoot station, a light rail station in Calgary, Alberta

== Science and technology ==
- Crow's foot notation, a set of symbols used to show relationships in a relational database management system
- Crowfoot wrench
- Crow's feet, a name for wrinkles in the outer corner of the eyes resulting from aging

=== Plants ===
- Cranesbill, or wild geranium
- Cardamine concatenata, crow's foot toothwort
- Eleusine indica, crow's foot grass
- Erodium spp.
- Crow's foot violet, two species of violets; See List of Viola species
- Water crowfoot, several Ranunculus species
- Diphasiastrum digitatum, crowsfoot

== Other uses ==
- Crowfoot (band), a 1970s-era California-based rock band
- Crow's-foot stitch, a kind of embroidery stitch
- Caltrop, an archaic anti-personnel weapon
- Broad arrow or pheon, a marker for British or British Empire government property
- Algiz or Elhaz, a Proto-Germanic rune

== See also ==
- Bird's Foot (disambiguation)
- Chicken foot (disambiguation)
- Chicken claw (disambiguation)
