= Crowfoot (surname) =

Crowfoot is a surname, and may refer to:

- Alfred Crowfoot (1881–1962), Anglican Dean of Quebec
- Bert Crowfoot, Canadian journalist, photographer and television producer
- Grace Mary Crowfoot (1879–1957), British archaeologist
- John Winter Crowfoot (1873–1959), British archaeologist
- Dorothy Mary Crowfoot Hodgkin (1910–1994) British chemist, 1964 Nobel Prize in Chemistry
- Tony Crowfoot (1936–2008), British Army officer
