= Goose step (disambiguation) =

Goose step may refer to:

- Goose step, a special form of the equal step, which is usually demonstrated in solemn military parades
- The Goose-Step, a 1923 book by Upton Sinclair
- The Goose-Step, a manoeuvre made famous by Australian Rugby Union player David Campese
- The Goose Steps Out a 1942 film comedy starring Will Hay
- Goose Step (film), based on the novel Goose Step, by Shepard Traube, filmed as Hitler – Beast of Berlin
