= Chicken sickles =

Chinese bladed weapons

Chicken sickles (traditional Chinese: 雞鐮; simplified Chinese: 鸡镰) are a number of Chinese bladed weapons similar to the hook sword and the Okinawan kama. They can be used as a single or double weapon. It is considered the special weapon of the xinyi liuhe style.

== Chicken-claw ==
Drawing of "Chicken-Claw Sickles"

The chicken-claw sickle (simplified Chinese: 鸡爪鐮; traditional Chinese: 雞爪鐮; pinyin: jīzhuǎlián; lit. 'Chicken-Claw Sickle') was constructed from a chicken claw-like piece of metal, along with a spear head, on a length of stick. Its length was about 1.5 ft (0.46 m). The details of this weapon are unknown.

This sickle is more similar in appearance to the Okinawan kama, with the addition of a spear head.

== Chicken-saber ==
The chicken-saber (simplified Chinese: 鸡刀鐮; traditional Chinese: 雞刀鐮; pinyin: jīdāolián; lit. 'Chicken-Saber Sickle'), also called the kunhuayaozi (simplified Chinese: 捆花腰子; traditional Chinese: 綑花腰子; pinyin: Kǔnhuāyāozi; lit. 'Binding Flower Waist Carry') was according to legend created by the founder of xinyi, Ji Jike. It became the special weapon of this style. It was made from metal and its length was about 2.5 Chi [3.2 ft (0.98 m)].”

This sickle is similar in appearance to the hook sword and although it is named a dao (saber), it is based on the double-edged sword (jian). There are several variations of this weapon. All have the distinctive hook and chicken "spur" on the head, but the sword blade is sometimes shortened to a small metal pole-arm. It is used for close-quarters combat.

One noted user of the chicken-saber was xinyi liuhe Grandmaster Lu Songgao (卢嵩高; d. 1962), one of the "Three Heroes from Zhoukou".

== See also ==
- Hook sword
- Kama (weapon)
- List of martial arts weapons
- Shaolin kung fu
