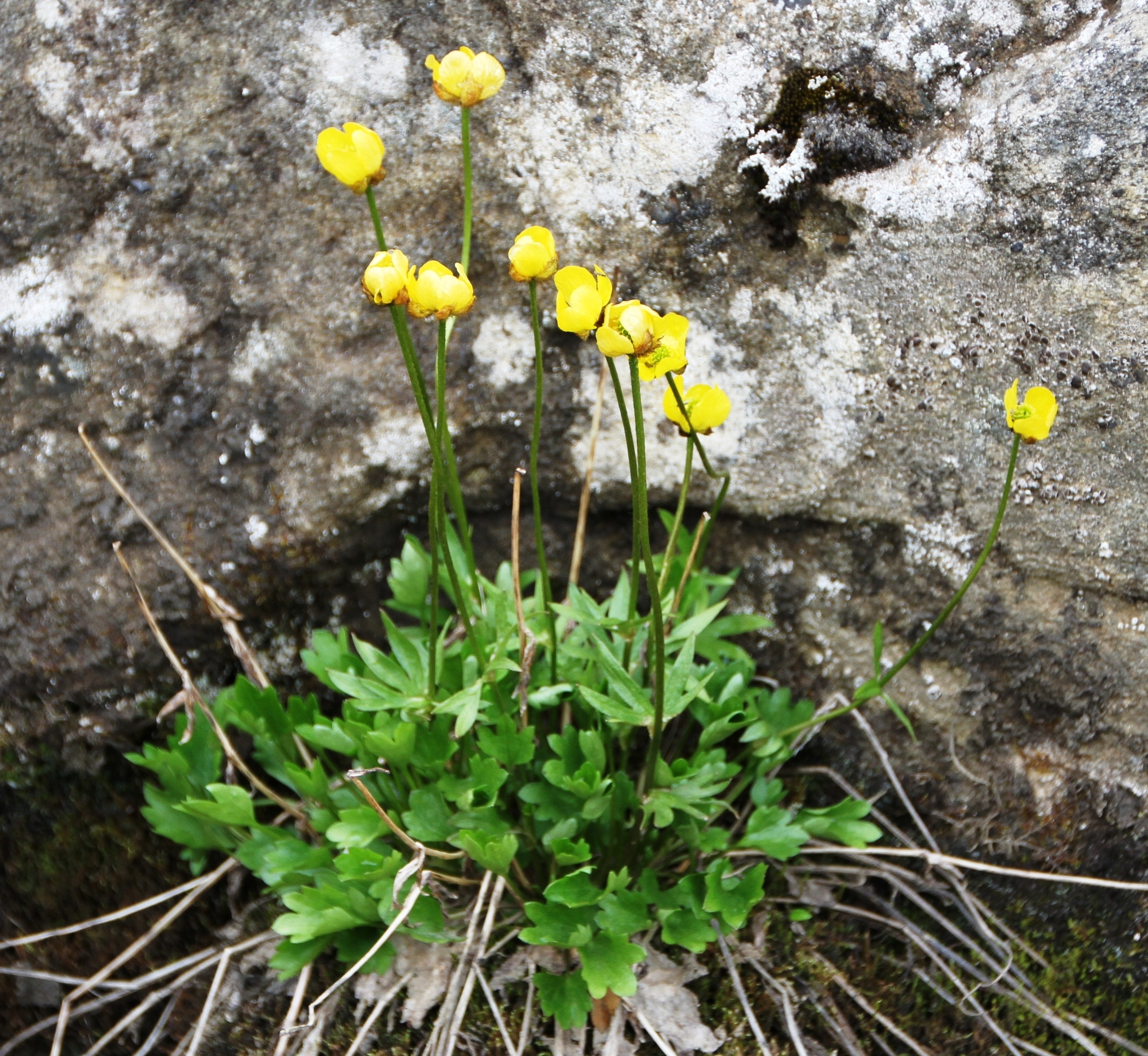
- R. pedatifidus in Svalbard, Norway

Conservation status
- Secure (NatureServe)

Scientific classification
- Kingdom: Plantae
- Clade: Tracheophytes
- Clade: Angiosperms
- Clade: Eudicots
- Order: Ranunculales
- Family: Ranunculaceae
- Genus: Ranunculus
- Species: R. pedatifidus

Binomial name
- Ranunculus pedatifidus Sm.

= Ranunculus pedatifidus =

Species of buttercup

Ranunculus pedatifidus is a species of buttercup known by the common names surefoot buttercup, northern buttercup, and birdfoot buttercup. It has a circumpolar distribution, occurring throughout the northern latitudes of the Northern Hemisphere. There are two varieties, var. pedatifidus occurring mostly in Asia and var. affinis mostly native to North America.

This plant is a perennial herb producing several erect stems up to about 46 centimeters in maximum height, each bearing one or more flowers. The leaf blades are divided into several pointed lobes which are entire or subdivided. The herbage is often very hairy. The flowers have up to 10 yellow petals, though some lack petals. The achenes develop in a cylindrical head. The variety affinis is usually a more robust plant, and the leaf segments are usually not subdivided into smaller lobes.

In North America, this species occurs in the Arctic, and farther to the south in alpine climates. It can be found throughout Canada north and south of the Arctic Circle, and down through the Pacific Northwest and Rocky Mountains in the United States. Its habitat includes Arctic and alpine tundra.
