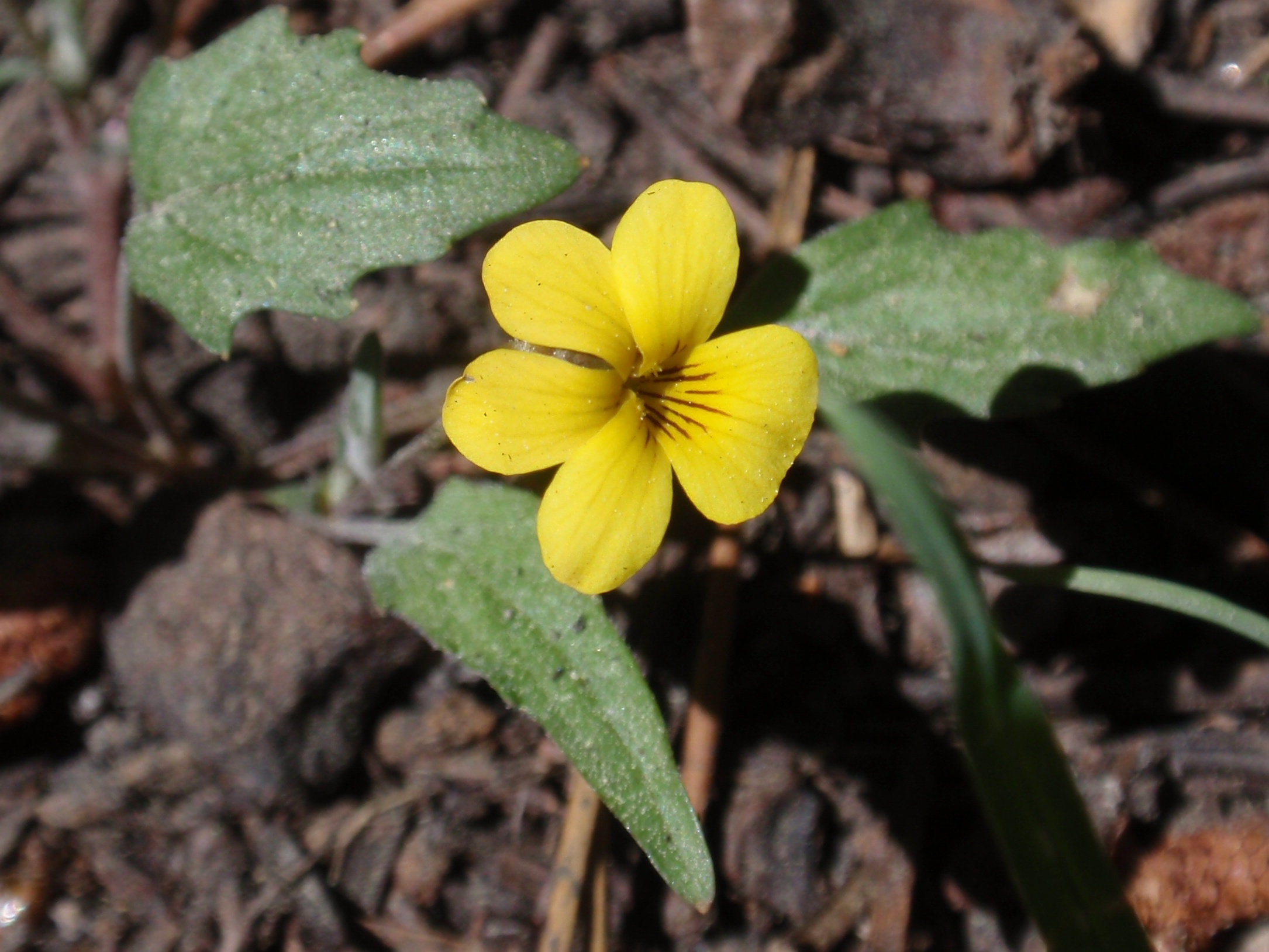

Conservation status
- Apparently Secure (NatureServe)

Scientific classification
- Kingdom: Plantae
- Clade: Tracheophytes
- Clade: Angiosperms
- Clade: Eudicots
- Clade: Rosids
- Order: Malpighiales
- Family: Violaceae
- Genus: Viola
- Species: V. pinetorum

Binomial name
- Viola pinetorum Greene

= Viola pinetorum =

Species of flowering plant

Viola pinetorum is a species of violet known by the common names goosefoot violet, goosefoot yellow violet, gray-leaved violet, or mountain yellow violet. It is endemic to California, where it grows in mountain ranges throughout the state. It occurs in various types of mountain habitat, including forests and talus. This herb grows from a tough taproot and produces an erect or decumbent stem up to about 22 centimeters long. The leaves are linear to oval in shape with pointed tips and toothed edges. The longest ones reach 15 to 20 centimeters in length. A solitary flower is borne on a long, upright stem. It has five yellow petals, the lowest three veined with brownish purple, and the upper two with brownish purple coloring on the outer surfaces.
