= Pes anserinus =

Pes anserinus ("goose's foot") refers to two anatomical structures:

- Pes anserinus (leg)
- Pes anserinus (facial nerve)

== See also ==
- Goose foot (disambiguation)
