= Cartesian skyscraper =

Proposed tower design by Le Corbusier

The Cartesian sky-scraper, designed by Le Corbusier in 1938, is a type of tower known for its modern and rational design. This type of modern administration building has its origin in the first sketches for the Pavillon de l'Esprit Nouveau in 1919, which proposed a cruciform shape for skyscrapers, radiating light and stability. In principle, the cruciform plan (with two axes) does not adapt itself to the path of the sun, which has only one axis. Studying further, it was seen that with this symmetrical form about two axes, the cruciform skyscraper does not receive sunlight on its north-facing sides.
