= Chicken claw =

Chicken claw may refer to:

- Chicken feet, a part of the chicken that is cooked in China, Indonesia, Korea, Japan, Laos, Singapore, Malaysia, Trinidad and Tobago, Ukraine, Russia, Romania, Moldova, Jamaica, South Africa, Peru, Mexico, Philippines and Vietnam
- Chicken sickles, a Chinese martial arts weapon
- "Chicken Claw", a song by That Handsome Devil
- The chicken claw, a variation of the Cartesian skyscraper
- Wrinkles in the outer corner of the eyes due to aging; these may resemble a chicken's claw

== See also ==
- Crow foot (disambiguation)
