= Ville Contemporaine =

Unrealized utopian planned community designed by Le Corbusier

The Ville contemporaine (French pronunciation: [vil kɔ̃tɑ̃pɔʁɛn], Contemporary City) was an unrealized utopian planned community intended to house three million inhabitants designed by the French-Swiss architect Le Corbusier in 1922.

== Plan ==
The centerpiece of this plan was a group of sixty-story cruciform skyscrapers built on steel frames and encased in curtain walls of glass. The skyscrapers housed both offices and the flats of the most wealthy inhabitants. These skyscrapers were set within large, rectangular park-like green spaces.

At the center of the planned city was a transportation hub which housed depots for buses and trains as well as highway intersections and at the top, an airport.

Le Corbusier segregated the pedestrian circulation paths from the roadways, and glorified the use of the automobile as a means of transportation. As one moved out from the central skyscrapers, smaller multi-story zigzag blocks set in green space and set far back from the street housed the proletarian workers.

== Critics ==
Robert Hughes spoke of Le Corbusier's city planning in his series The Shock of the New:

"...the car would abolish the human street, and possibly the human foot. Some people would have aeroplanes too. The one thing no one would have is a place to bump into each other, walk the dog, strut, one of the hundred random things that people do ... being random was loathed by Le Corbusier ... its inhabitants surrender their freedom of movement to the omnipresent architect."

== See also ==
- Experimental Prototype Community of Tomorrow (concept)
- Ville Radieuse
