= Miguel Ángel Moenck =

Cuban architect (1890–1969)

Dr. Miguel Á. Moenck
- Born: Miguel Ángel de los Dolores Amado de Jésus Moenck y Peralta; September 13, 1890; Havana, Cuba
- Died: August 31, 1969 (aged 78)
- Occupation: Architect
- Practice: Moenck & Quintana
- Buildings: Havana Biltmore Yacht and Country Club; Pro-Arte Musical Auditorium; School of Engineering and Architecture at the University of Havana; Havana Bus Terminal; Novia del Mediodía; Hotel Cabañas del Sol

Miguel Ángel Moenck was a Cuban-born architect.

== Early history ==
Miguel Ángel Moenck was born on September 13, 1890, in Havana, Cuba.

He excelled at various sports. In 1907, Moenck who studied engineering at Cornell University introduced basketball to the Havana YMCA. In 1913, Moenck formed the Union of Amateur Athletics, also known as the Union Athletica de Amateurs de Cuba, in Havana. Moenck was a member of the National Amateur Baseball League and also managed Atlético de Cuba, an amateur athletic club.

In the early 1920s, he enrolled at Tulane University and returned to Cuba in the mid-1920s with his architecture degree. The University of Havana employed the Tulane graduate as a professor of architecture.

== Olympics ==
He was elected President of the newly formed Cuban Olympic Committee in 1926, and he served in that capacity until 1930, then again in 1934. He was later elected to the International Olympic Committee (IOC), holding the Cuban seat from 1938 to 1969. In 1953, he became the first Latin American to be elected to the IOC's executive board.

== Career ==
Miguel Ángel Moenck co-founded Moenck & Quintana in 1928 with Nicolás Quintana Arango, serving as co-director of the architectural firm. Among the prominent buildings designed by Moenck & Quintana are the Havana Bus Terminal, the Pro-Arte Musical Auditorium, the School of Engineering and Architecture at the University of Havana, and the Biltmore Yacht and Country Club. Following the death of Nicolas Quintana Arango, his son Nicolás Quintana would eventually become co-director of the firm in 1951. The 1957 hotel Cabañas del Sol was designed by the two.

== Death ==
Miguel Ángel Moenck died on August 31, 1969, in Havana, Cuba.
