= Polevitzky, Johnson and Associates =

American architecture firm

Practice information
- Firm type: Architecture
- Founders: Igor B. Polevitzky; Verner Johnson
- Founded: 1951 in Miami, Florida

Significant works and honors
- Buildings: Hotel Habana Riviera; Golden Gate Hotel and Motel
- Design: Miami Central High School

Polevitzky, Johnson and Associates was an architectural firm with headquarters in Miami, Florida.

== History ==
Polevitzky, Johnson and Associates, Inc. was established in 1951 in Miami, Florida. After coming back from World War II in the mid-1940s, Igor B. Polevitzky opened a new office in the Brickell neighbourhood and partnered with Verner Johnson.

Illustrator J. M. Smith, Jerome L. Schilling, Samuel S. Block, and William H. Arthur were among the firm's longtime associates. Photographers like Earl Struck, Jim Forney, Rudi Rada, Ernest Graham, Samuel H. Gottscho, and Robert R. Blanch were among those who worked as photographers frequently.

In 1957, Meyer Lanksy commissioned the firm's senior partner Igor Polevitzky to design the Hotel Habana Riviera. Along with Verner Johnson and Associates, Polevitzky collaborated with Miguel Gastón and Manuel Carrerá, two architects from Cuba. Built in the Vedado neighborhood of Havana, Cuba, the sixteen-story skyscraper was constructed on the Malecón beachfront boulevard.

The Miami-based architectural firm was brought in to redesign the original Biltmore Yacht and Country Club after the winter of 1957, but the Cuban Revolution stopped it from ever being built.

The founders of Polevitzky, Johnson and Associates disbanded in the mid-1960s. Around 1967, Igor Poletvitzky relocated permanently from his Miami home to Estes Park, Colorado. The firm took on projects until the early 1970s.
