= Big Five Club =

Social club

General information
- Location: Miami, Florida, United States, 600 SW 92nd Ave
- Opened: October 10, 1967; 58 years ago

Website
- Official website

Big Five Club is a Cuban-American social club in Miami, Florida.

== History ==
The Big Five Club was established in Miami, Florida by Cuban exiles on October 10, 1967, following the 1959 Revolution. Manuel R. Morales Gomez, a former lawyer in Havana, was the founding president of the club. Morales-Gomez coordinated 250 families to pool their resources, with each contributing whatever amount they were able, to purchase a 10-acre tract for $69,000 in what was described as a remote, undeveloped location. The property was a tract of land in what was formerly the unincorporated Dade area west of Miami.

Positioned on Southwest 92nd Avenue near Eighth Street, the property eventually expanded to over 20 acres. The private facility provided members with an Olympic-sized swimming pool, tennis courts, basketball and squash courts, card rooms, massage services (including both male and female massage therapists), Finnish saunas, exercise classes, recreation areas, and separate weight training facilities. Social events included formal balls and monthly fashion shows, and families could access pony rides for children. The club's founding purpose was to serve Latin youth through social programming and sports while maintaining traditional family structures and cultural practices.

The club was composed of former members of five of Havana's top yacht and golf clubs. Originally, a family was considered for membership only if there was a connection to the five biggest private clubs in pre-revolutionary Havana - the Biltmore Yacht and Country Club, Havana Yacht Club, the Miramar Yacht Club, Vedado Tennis Club, and Casino Español de La Habana. The policy was modified by the late 1970s and was no longer applied to the newer generation of Cubans. The membership process required candidates to obtain sponsorship from two existing members, followed by a vote of approval or disapproval from the 12-member board of directors.

By 1985, its membership list included 1,600 members and their families. Notable honorary members included former Miami mayors Stephen P. Clark and Maurice Ferré.

== Presidents ==
- Manuel R. Morales Gomez (1967-1978)
- Dr. Manuel J. Rodriguez
- Fernando Martínez Jr.
- Fausto Diaz Oliver
- Juan Torres
- Jorge Piedra
