= Nicolás Quintana Arango =

Cuban architect

Nicolás Quintana
- Born: Nicolás Quintana y Arango; Havana, Cuba
- Died: 1950; Havana, Cuba
- Occupation: Architect
- Spouse: Isabel Quintana
- Children: Nicolás Quintana
- Parent(s): Nicolás Quintana; Celia Arango
- Practice: Moenck & Quintana
- Buildings: Havana Biltmore Yacht and Country Club; Pro-Arte Musical Auditorium; University of Havana: School of Engineering and Architecture; University of Havana: School of Medicine; Havana Bus Terminal

Nicolás Quintana was a Cuban architect.

== Early history ==
Nicolás Quintana y Arango was born in Havana, Cuba, the son of Nicolás Quintana and Celia Arango. His father worked as a Basque cabinetmaker.

== Career ==
Co-founding Moenck & Quintana in 1928 alongside Miguel Ángel Moenck, Nicolás Quintana was the co-director at the architectural firm. The Havana Bus Terminal, Biltmore Yacht and Country Club, and the University of Havana's School of Engineering and Architecture as well as the School of Medicine are among the notable structures that Quintana designed. His son Nicolás Quintana would eventually become co-director of the firm following his death.

== Death ==
Nicolás Quintana y Arango died in 1950 in Havana, Cuba.
