= Birdcage House =

Interior

South elevation

North elevation

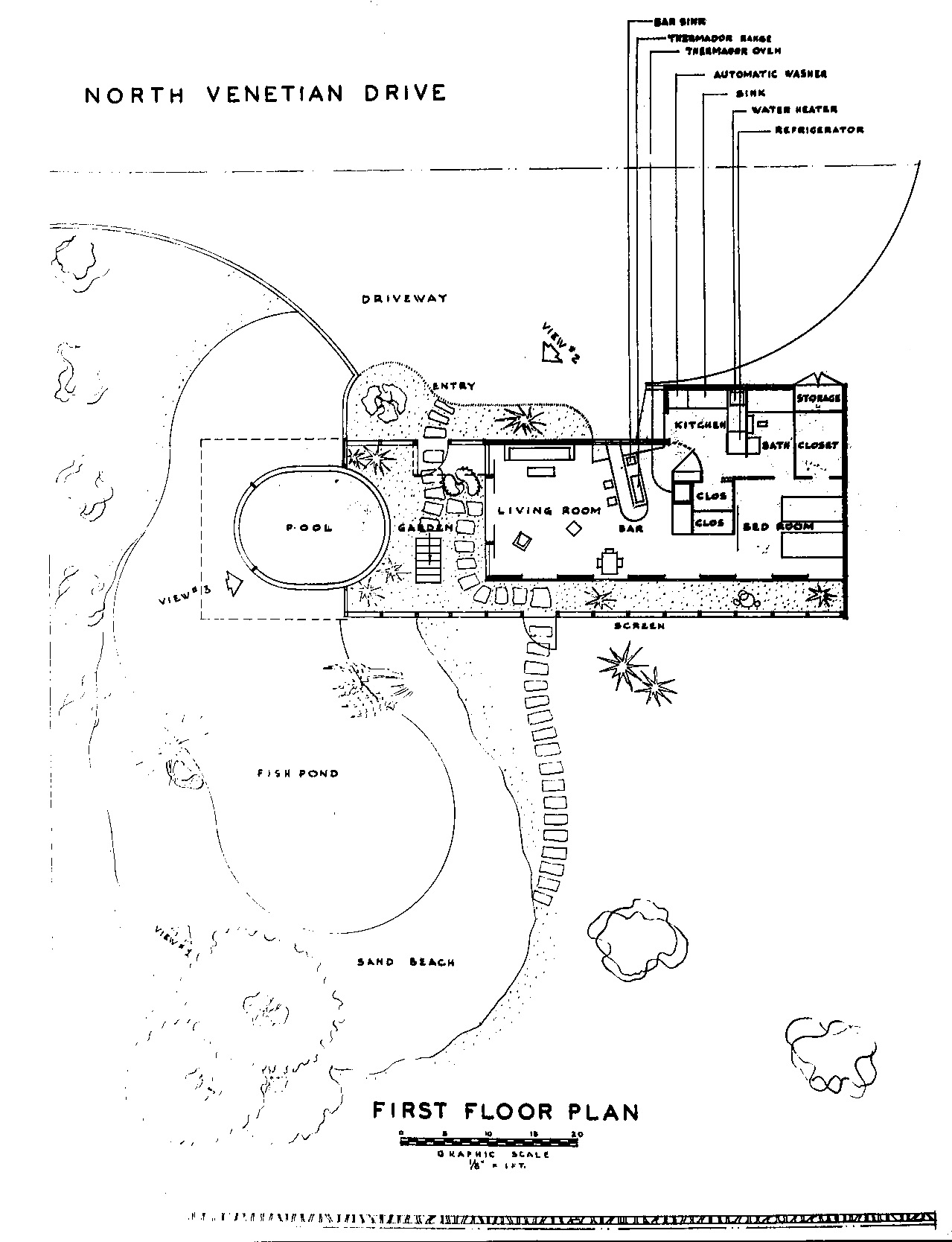
Floor plan drawing

The Heller Residence #2 or Bird-Cage house (a termed coined by a June 1950 Life article of the same name), was a split-level wood and concrete residence surrounded by a diaphanous aluminum screen, constructed in 1949 in Miami, Florida, USA. The building incorporated the use of new materials, including the presence of open-web steel trusses, never seen in residential construction before. The latest and most-popular of a series of homes designed by Igor B. Polevitzky called the Tropotype, these homes were developed between 1936 and 1949. Designed specifically for the South Florida environment, these homes emphasized health, happiness and productivity for the occupant. The Bird-Cage House and other Tropotypes before it, utilized passive-energy designs making them extremely energy-efficient and contained an ambiguous living envelope to encourage what was considered at the time to be a healthy, simultaneous indoor-outdoor lifestyle. Referring to the house during a 1946 lecture at the University of Florida, Polevitzky described them as "...architecture as a volume rather than a mass".

Although there were many variations before it, the Bird-Cage house was the epitome of indoor-outdoor living, where the envelope between the inside and outside was barely distinguishable. Designed for Michael Heller, an appliance salesman, the materials used by Polevitzky to construct the house were of the latest post-war technology, so advanced that many critics at the time were unsure how the materials could be purchased. Polevitzky’s submission to the GI Homes competition in 1946, just three years before the completion of the Bird-Cage featured the same materials. In this competition, Polevitzky was placed second. The jury, composed of leading architects of the region, commented that although the designs were exceptional, they were unsure of the availability of the materials Polevitzky selected. The Bird-Cage house was a full-scale demonstration of these materials.

Later noted for its advancement in building construction, the home was featured in the May 1950 issue of Architectural Forum Magazine and then in House and Garden magazine in July of the same year. Polevitzky is identified locally as a "major distributor of International Style" both by architectural magazines and Le Corbusier himself.

The Bird-Cage house became the most-popular and last of the Tropotype houses designed by Polevitzky and one of his most famous works after the Hotel Habana Riviera, Albion and Shelborne Hotels, all of which still exist in modified condition and are designated historical landmarks for their significance. In Polevitzky’s nomination for Fellowship to the American Institute of Architects, Marion Manley wrote, "He has done a remarkably fine job in leading the architects in Miami and of Florida away from petty differences and into constructive programs."
