= Hyman Abrams =

Russian-American gangster (1901–1975)

- Born: May 1, 1901; Vilnius, Russian Empire
- Died: January 1975 (aged 73); Las Vegas, Nevada
- Education: The Mather School
- Known for: Mafia associate, Mafia financier
- Spouse: Harriet Janice Allison

Hyman Abrams (born Abramovitz; May 1, 1901 – January 1975) was an American businessman, Boston mobster, and high-ranking member under Charles "King" Solomon during Prohibition.

== Biography ==
Abrams was born into a Jewish family in Vilnius, Russian Empire (now Lithuania), the son of Israel and Ethel "Etta" Dimenstein Abramovitz. They immigrated to Boston in 1906. He became a U.S. citizen in 1923, when he changed his surname to Abrams. He started out as a restaurateur in Boston. Abrams and other members of Solomon's organization took over Boston's criminal operations for themselves following Solomon's murder in 1933. He would later become involved in financing syndicate controlled casinos with Meyer Lansky, specifically the Flamingo and later the Sands with Carl Cohen and Jack Entratter. In 1957, he partnered with Moe Dalitz, Morris Kleinman, Sam Tucker, Wilbur Clark (of the Desert Inn and Lansky's Hotel Nacional casino), Ed Levinson (of the Fremont Hotel and Casino), Charles "Babe" Baron (who represented Sam Giancana), and Morris Rosen (of the Flamingo Hotel) to build the Hotel Habana Riviera casino in Havana.

In 1968, Abrams married Harriet Janice Allison, a dancer in Las Vegas. They divorced in 1971. He died in January 1975 in Las Vegas.
