= Moenck & Quintana =

Cuban architecture firm

Practice information
- Firm type: Architecture
- Key architects: Nicolás Quintana; Daniel Taboada
- Founders: Miguel Ángel Moenck; Nicolás Quintana Arango
- Founded: 1925 in Havana, Cuba

Significant works and honors
- Buildings: Havana Biltmore Yacht and Country Club; Pro-Arte Musical Auditorium; School of Engineering and Architecture and School of Medicine at the University of Havana; Novia del Mediodía; Hotel Cabañas del Sol; Hotel Club Kawama; Varadero Yacht Club Residential Condominum
- Projects: Havana Bus Terminal

Moenck & Quintana, also known as Moenck y Quintana Arquitectos, was an architectural firm with headquarters in Havana, Cuba.

== History ==
Moenck & Quintana was founded in Havana in 1925 by Nicolás Quintana Arango and Miguel Ángel Moenck.

The Moenck & Quintana firm designed the Havana Bus Terminal, the Pro-Arte Musical Auditorium, the School of Engineering and Architecture at the University of Havana, and the Biltmore Yacht and Country Club. Havana's inter-provisional bus terminal building was designed by the firm and built in Boyeros from 1948 to 1951.

In 1951, after Nicolás Quintana Arango died, his son Nicolás Quintana took charge of the firm as a co-director and embraced the modernist style.

In 1957, the Cabañas del Sol hotel in Varadero, Cuba was designed by the firm.
