= Ed Levinson =

American criminal and gambling operator

- Born: Edward Levinson; March 2, 1898; Chicago, Illinois, U.S.
- Died: December 26, 1981 (aged 83); Los Angeles, California, U.S.
- Occupation: Mobster

Edward Levinson (March 2, 1898, to December 26, 1981) was an American criminal and gambling operator.

He was raised in Chicago, Illinois, then joined the underworld in Detroit, Michigan, in the 1920s and became an associate of Meyer Lansky. Levinson and his brothers moved to Newport, Kentucky, in the 1930s, where they dominated illegal gambling. In the 1940s he moved to Miami, then in 1952 to Las Vegas, where he became a part owner and operator of various legitimate hotels and casinos. For several years he ran the Fremont Hotel and Casino. Illegal FBI tapes seemed to show that Levinson was involved in skimming profits for delivery to hidden underworld partners. In the 1960s he became involved in enterprises in which he was associated with senior politicians of the Democratic Party.

== Early career ==
Edward Levinson was born on March 2, 1898, to a Jewish family in Chicago, Illinois. His mother, Mary Goodman Levinson, was the aunt of Edward M. Gertz, who was involved in the liquor business in Chicago during the Prohibition Era. Ed and his brothers Mike and "Sleepout" Louis grew up in Chicago, then moved to Detroit where they joined the underworld, ran two casinos and were active in the 1920s newspaper circulation wars. Ed Levinson was a prominent member of the Detroit illegal gambling fraternity and collaborated with Samuel Garfield, a friend of Moe Dalitz. He was arrested occasionally, but usually the charges were dismissed. Levinson became an associate of Bugsy Siegel (1906–47), the partner of Meyer Lansky.

=== Newport, Kentucky ===
The Levinson brothers moved to Newport, Kentucky, in the 1930s as representatives of Lansky's national organized crime syndicate. Newport was on the other side of the Ohio River from Cincinnati. The Levinsons became key players in the flashy casino gambling scene in Newport, as did the "Cleveland Four", of which Moe Dalitz was a leader. At one time Levinson controlled the illegal gambling in Newport. The 633/Flamingo Club at 633 York Street was opened in the late 1930s by Arthur Dennert. The Levinsons forced Dennert out of control and turned the Flamingo into one of the most popular casinos in Newport. They let Dennert retain his share.

Pete Schmidt, who had been forced out of his Newport, Kentucky club Beverley Hills Country Club by the syndicate, remodeled his Glenn Hotel in Newport in 1943 and expanded the casino, renaming it the Glenn Rendezvous. Dennert also had interests in the Glenn Rendezvous. The syndicate did not accept the competition from Schmidt, and their associates began a campaign of urinating publicly in the lobby. Schmidt gave in to the pressure. In 1948 the Levinson brothers and Arthur Dennert bought the Glenn Rendezvous. Dennert opened the Club Alexandria in 1949, a casino that could hold hundreds of gamblers. Dennert was killed in an auto crash in 1952, in which foul play was suspected. The Cleveland Four claimed his share in the Flamingo.

In the late 1940s Levinson partnered with Gil "the Brain" Beckley in running the Bobben Realty layoff bank, which would become the largest layoff bank in the country. (Note: A layoff bank shares the risk with a bookmaker who has taken a large bet in return for a share of the profit. It is larger and better-financed than an individual bookmaker. The Bobben Realty layoff bank handled most of the betting in the midwest.)

=== Miami ===
Ed Levinson started gambling operations in south Florida in the late 1940s. Routine operations in Newport were handled by his brother Louis and others such as Ed Whitfield, Red Masterson and the Bermans. Mike and Louis Levinson ran gambling places in Covington, Kentucky, (Note: Covington, Kentucky, and Newport, Kentucky, are adjoining communities on the opposite side of the Ohio River from Cincinnati, part of the Cincinnati conurbation but more many years subject to less strict enforcement of gambling laws.) until stopped by a reform in 1960. In 1950 and again in 1951 Ed Levinson was arrested in Miami for offenses related to gambling, but was not convicted.

== Las Vegas ==
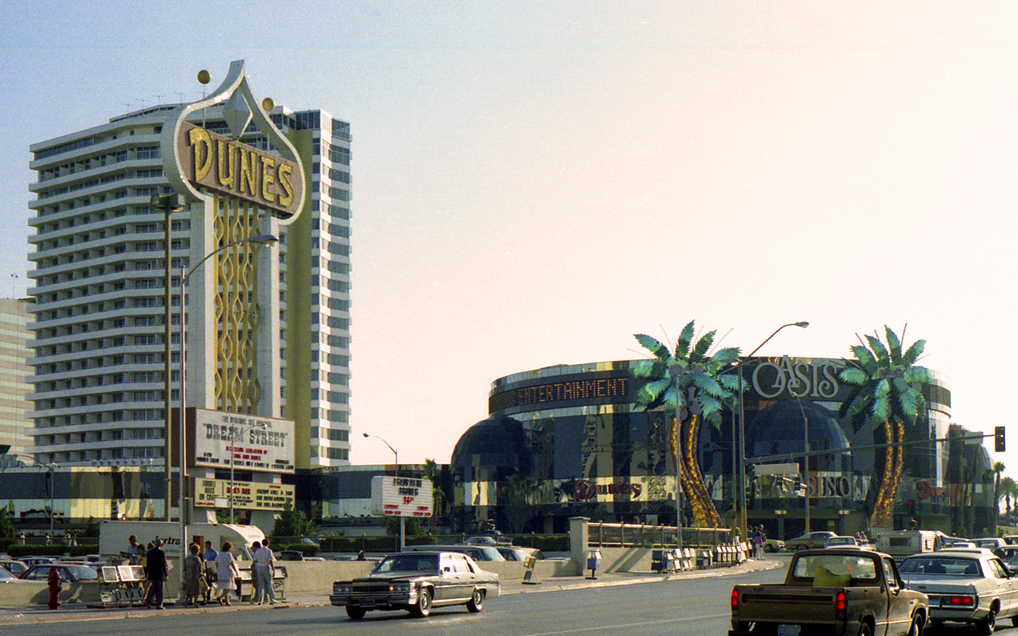
The Dunes

Levinson was one of the investors in the Sands Hotel and Casino, which opened on December 15, 1952. There were many other investors, including the oilman Jake Freedman of Texas, Sid Wyman, Hyman Abrams and Jack Entratter. The performers Frank Sinatra and Dean Martin both bought minor interests in the hotel. Although Jake Freedman was ostensibly the main shareholder, it was really controlled by Frank Costello.

In May 1953 the Nevada Tax Commission said it was well aware of the backgrounds of gamblers and hoodlums that the final report of the California Crime Commission had named as trying to become established in the legal gambling industry in Nevada. These included Levinson, Joseph Stacher, Mack Kufferman, Meyer Lansky, Malcolm Clarke and William Bischoff. Levinson was described as a bookmaker in Florida, Kentucky and elsewhere. The Nevada commission secretary pointed out that unlike other states Nevada distinguished between gamblers, who were legal and licensed, and racketeers, who were not. He said both Levinson and Clarke, licensed in the Sands Hotel, had gambling backgrounds which were studied minutely before they were granted casino permits.

In September 1953 Levinson, described as "Sands casino boss", was quoted extolling the value provided by Las Vegas hotels with their low prices, swimming pools, plush casinos and high-quality entertainment. A newspaper report in September 1954 said the Flamingo Hotel was being sold for between $9 and $10 million to a Chicago syndicate of mid-west bookies and gamblers. Ed Levinson would be connected with the Flamingo after the sale. The Nevada Tax Commission said it knew nothing about the deal. The Dunes opened on 23 May 1955 and soon ran into financial difficulty. The Sands management agreed to take over operation of the Dunes, and the Nevada Tax Commission agreed to an arrangement where Ed Levinson would run the casino and Jack Entratter would be Entertainment Director for both hotels. The Sands team could not turn the Dunes around, and it was sold to new owners in 1956.

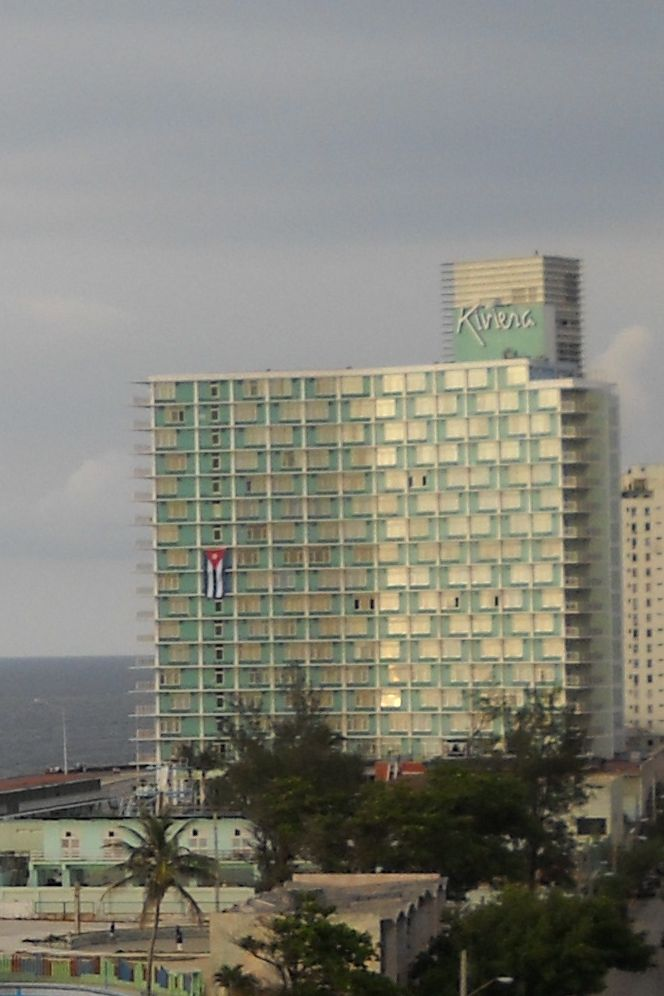
Havana Riviera

Levinson partnered with Lou Lurie, a San Francisco financier who had experience with hotels in Miami, to build the 15-story Fremont, the first refined hotel in downtown Las Vegas. The Fremont Hotel and Casino opened on May 18, 1956, in downtown Las Vegas. Levinson had a 20% share of the Fremont, which had been built using loans from the Teamsters. Levinson brought in Chef Shillig, formerly of the Ritz Hotel in Paris and the Savoy in London, and made Ed Torres the food and beverage manager. Torres and Levinson arranged high-class entertainers like Wayne Newton, Kay Starr, Pat Boone and Helen Reddy to draw the crowds. Levinson managed Meyer Lansky's Havana Riviera before Fidel Castro took over Cuba in January 1959 and closed it down. Levinson moved back to Las Vegas in 1959 to run the Fremont. In 1959 Levinson, Carl Cohen and Jack Entratter headed a group that bought the Riviera hotel and casino in Las Vegas.

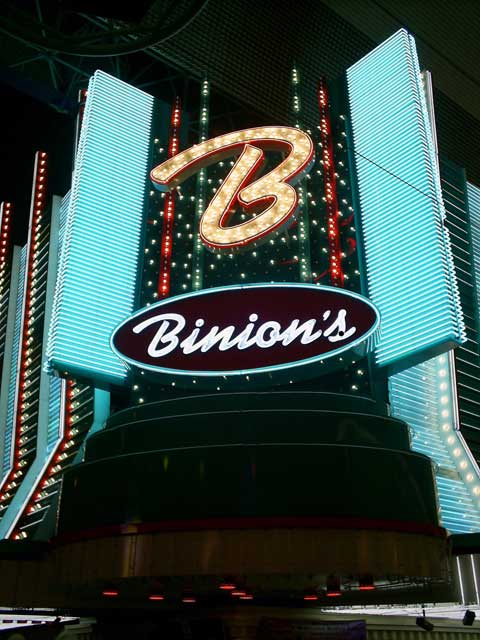
Binion's Horseshoe

Levinson bought a 27% share of Binion's Horseshoe. The Horseshoe reopened in June 1961 after a construction project costing more than $2 million had combined it with the former Boulder club. Levinson, president of the Horseshoe as well as the Fremont, came up with the concept of the Horseshoe's exterior with its huge marquee. In 1964 Benny Binion bought back the shares that Levinson and his associates held in the Horseshoe and took back control of the operation.

In February 1962 Levinson applied for approval of a sale of one third of his share in the Fremont to local businessman Jerome D. Mack for a maximum price of $370,000. Levinson would keep a 20% share in the Fremont. The hotel was going through a massive expansion at the time in which more than a block would be filled with new facilities. In 1966 the Parvin-Dohrman Company of Los Angeles bought the Fremont. Albert Parvin, head of the company, was connected to Levinson and to the Teamsters. His Parvin Foundation owned a share of the mortgage on the Flamingo.

== Alleged skimming ==
The Federal Bureau of Investigation (FBI) placed a "bug" (hidden microphone) in Levinson's Fremont office in 1961. The bug recorded Levinson saying of profit skimming, "You can't steal $100,000 a month and pay dividends. If you steal $50,000? Well, maybe ...". An FBI report on the gambling industry recorded an informant's account of a conversation on January 21, 1963, between Levinson and Torres, vice-president of the Fremont, who were counting money and determining how much would be skimmed. Levinson said Meyer was getting the New Jersey money. Torres said he thought Meyer only handled the Florida area. Levinson answered that "it all goes to Florida, then to New York and New Jersey".

The FBI bug recorded Benjamin B. Siegelbaum, a friend of Lansky, telling Levinson, "Meyer wants a breakdown". They took this to mean Lansky wanted to know how the skim was to be divided up. They thought the recording showed Levinson was counting out skim money from the Sands, Fremont, Flamingo and Horseshoe into shares that would be taken by courier to the hidden partners in the mob. From the bug the FBI estimated that Lansky had an investment in the casinos of about $2.2 million, and earned $1 million per year from the combined skim. In April 1963 FBI listeners heard Levinson reading aloud from a report on the skimming operation the FBI had just written. He said, "My God, they even know about Ida [Devine]. (Note: Ida Devine was the wife of Iriving Devine, one of the main suppliers of meat in Las Vegas. She would deliver skim money by train from Las Legas to Chicago, New York, Cleveland and Miami.)" The casino operators at once searched their premises for bugs, and found microphones planted by the FBI in Levinson's office, the Dunes and the Horseshoe. (Note: In 1966 Attorney General Nicholas Katzenbach ruled that more than 900 pages of wiretapped conversations between people involved in organized crime could not be used as evidence.) There was even a bug in Levinson's bedroom. Levinson brought a lawsuit against the FBI for the bugging.

== Bobby Baker scandal ==
Bobby Baker, a protege of Lyndon B. Johnson, and Fred Black, a lobbyist for North American Aviation, met Levinson at a pre-inauguration party in Washington, D.C., in January 1961 before John F. Kennedy took office. They were probably introduced by Benny Sigelbaum, who was a friend of Baker. The District of Columbia National bank was chartered in 1962 with Bobby Baker, Fred Black, Levinson and Sigelbaum as stockholders, as well as various senior Democratic politicians or their relatives. Levinson, Baker and Jack Cooper, a Miami businessman and arms dealer, tried to arrange deals in the Dominican Republic. Baker tried to use his influence to obtain a casino license there for Levinson, but did not succeed. In November 1962 the bugs in Levinson's office at the Fremont picked up references to Baker. The FBI agent notified FBI chief J. Edgar Hoover of the references early in 1963 because, "I thought it was important for Washington to be aware of the possible political influence of Ed Levinson."

Senator Kerr (Note: Senator Robert S. Kerr was chairman of the Senate Committee in Aeronautical and Space Sciences. One of his banks made a large loan to Serv-U.) arranged financing to set up to Serv-U Corporation, which obtained a near-monopoly on machines selling soft drinks, candy and cigarettes on sites where companies were working on government defense contracts. These included North American Aviation, Northrop Corporation and Space Technologies. George Simon of Miami, chief accountant of the International Hotel chain, invested $80,000 and apparently arranged investments by Levinson, Torres and Sigelbaum. Ernest Tucker, Bobby Baker's lawyer, also invested in the business. Levinson and Seigelbaum arranged with an Oklahoma City bank for a $400,000 start-up loan for the Serve-U Corporation to buy equipment and supplies. The alleged labor racketeer Mike Singer was on the payroll. (Note: Myer (Mike) Singer, business agent of Teamsters Local 626B, was called for questioning by the Senate Select Committee on Improper Activities in the Labor or Management Field in 1959 but invoked the Fifth Amendment.) By 1963 Serv-U was making millions of dollars annually.

The Senate launched a two-year investigation in 1963. In December 1963 Fred Black told senators investigating Baker's role in the vending machine affair, "I go along as far as Levinson is concerned with gambling, but he is far from being a racketeer." Levinson appeared before the Senate Rules Committee on March 2, 1964, and was asked who else had gone on the trips he made the Dominican Republic with Bobby Baker. They were probing to find out if Lyndon Johnson had been involved in attempts by the mob to open gambling concessions in the Dominican Republic. Levinson refused to answer any questions. The Senate eventually found that Baker did nothing illegal but was guilty of improper conduct. Later the government charged Baker with larceny, fraud and income tax evasion.

== Later career ==
In 1965 the Federal Bureau of Narcotics suspected that Levinson was involved in Meyer Lansky's drug smuggling business. In September 1966 it was reported that Ed Levinson and nine other Fremont Hotel executives had been served a subpoena to give information to US attorneys related to a suit against the FBI over the wiretapping. The Nevada Gaming commission wanted to call Levinson as a witness. In May 1973 Levinson, 74, was resident in Las Vegas, and was reportedly involved with Lansky in investments in oil wells. He died peacefully after a long life in the County of Los Angeles, California.

An FBI recording of Black's hotel suite in April 1963 recorded him saying of Levinson to columnist Jack Anderson, "Jack, some day when Eddie comes here for dinner or something, I want you to meet him. He's a little hard to describe. I know his whole background. He was probably the biggest bookmaker Detroit ever had. I know he was the biggest gambler Miami ever had. Then he went to Las Vegas. He came under the granddaddy law; it excused him for anything he ever did as long as he stayed working in Nevada. He told us all those things."

== Bibliography ==
- "All Rivved Up: Strip survivor Riviera celebrating birthday No. 50", Las Vegas Sun, April 19, 2005
- Anderson, Jack (February 2, 1964), "Aviation Lobbyist Testifies About Baker and Gambling", Burlington Hawk Eye
- "Bankers, Gamblers Subpoenaed by U.S.", Nevada State Journal, September 14, 1966
- "Banking Under the 'Great Society'", The Chicago Tribune, April 4, 1965
- Barker, Thomas; Potter, Gary W.; Meglen, Jenna (2008), Wicked Newport: Kentucky's Sin City, The History Press, ISBN 978-1-59629-549-0
- Block, Alan A. (1998), Masters of Paradise: Organized Crime and the Internal Revenue Service in the Bahamas, Transaction Publishers, ISBN 978-1-4128-2819-2
- Burbank, Jeff (2008-03-07), Las Vegas Babylon: The True Tales of Glitter, Glamour, and Greed, M. Evans, ISBN 978-1-4616-6308-9
- Capeci, Jerry (2005-01-04), The Complete Idiot's Guide to the Mafia, Alpha Books, ISBN 978-1-59257-305-9
- Caraway, Robin (2009), Newport: The Sin City Years, Arcadia Publishing, ISBN 978-0-7385-6857-7
- Caro, Robert A. (2012-05-01), The Passage of Power: The Years of Lyndon Johnson IV, Knopf Doubleday Publishing Group, ISBN 978-0-307-96046-7
- Conforte, Joe; Toll, David W. (2011-01-28), Breaks, Brains & Balls, eBookIt.com, ISBN 978-0-940936-20-1
- "Ed Levinson. Fremont Chief To Sell Stock", Las Vegas Sun, p. 1, February 28, 1962
- "FBI Claims Baker Inquiry Started Before '63 Furor", Avalanche Journal, p. 127, November 17, 1966
- Gaver, Jack (June 16, 1963), "Casino Center Anniversary Party Today", Las Vegas Sun, p. 24
- Gertz, Stephen J. (March 23, 2010). "The Biggest Jew In Chicago Part 2". Seattle Pi.
- "Hollywood Film Shop", Yuma Daily Sun, p. 8, September 29, 1953
- Mailer, Norman (2014-06-03), Of a Fire on the Moon, Random House Publishing Group, ISBN 978-0-553-39062-9
- Miller, David (2002-09-01), The JFK Conspiracy, iUniverse, ISBN 978-0-595-25267-1
- Moehring, Eugene P. (2000), Resort City in the Sunbelt: Las Vegas, 1930-2000, University of Nevada Press, ISBN 978-0-87417-356-7
- Nelson, Phillip F. (2013-07-01), LBJ: The Mastermind of the JFK Assassination, Skyhorse Publishing Inc., ISBN 978-1-62087-610-7
- "Nevada Gamblers Listed in Report Of Crime Probers", Reno Evening Gazette, p. 11, May 11, 1953
- North, Mark (2011), Act of Treason: The Role of J. Edgar Hoover in the Assassination of President Kennedy, Skyhorse Publishing Inc., ISBN 978-1-61608-213-0
- Pearson, Drew (March 4, 1964), "The Washington Merry-go-round: Baker took the fifth to protect only Baker; Bobby was a flop as influence peddler", Camden News, p. 10
- Pearson, Drew; Anderson, Jack (July 6, 1968), "House Makes Gesture at Tax Reforms", Eureka Times Standard, p. Page 8
- Pearson, Drew (January 5, 1968b), "Interview Bugged by FBI", Dover Daily Reporter, p. 25
- Rose, Frank (1996), The Agency: William Morris and the Hidden History of Show Business, Frank Rose, ISBN 978-0-88730-807-9
- Russo, Gus (2008-12-02), The Outfit, Bloomsbury Publishing, ISBN 978-1-59691-897-9
- "Sale of Vegas Hotel News To Tax Commission", Nevada State Journal, p. 7, September 29, 1954
- Schwartz, David G. (2003), Suburban Xanadu: The Casino Resort on the Las Vegas Strip and Beyond, Psychology Press, ISBN 978-0-415-93556-2
- "Select Labor Committee Issues Final Report", CQ Almanac, 1960
- Sheehan, Jack (1997), The Players: The Men who Made Las Vegas, University of Nevada Press, ISBN 978-0-87417-306-2
- Swanson, Doug (2014-08-14), Blood Aces: The Wild Ride of Benny Binion, the Texas Gangster Who Created Vegas Poker, Penguin, ISBN 978-0-698-16350-8
- "Tax Commission Not Surprised By Crime Report", Nevada State Journal, p. 8, May 12, 1953
- "The Dunes Hotel History- The Miracle in the Desert -1950s". Classic Las Vegas. March 4, 2008. Archived from the original on December 23, 2015.
- "Tougher oil lease rules sought, Fress Press says", Clare Sentinel, 1973-05-16
- Trimble, Gene (May 2013), Illegal Of The Day number 199 (PDF), Marlow Casino Chips
- Zirbel, Craig I (2010), JFK: The Final Chapter on the Assassination of John F. Kennedy, ISBN 978-0-9828920-1-5
