= Nicolás Quintana =

Cuban architect (1925–2011)

- Born: Nicolás José Braulio del Carmen Quintana y Gómez Arango Díaz; January 26, 1925; Havana, Cuba
- Died: May 31, 2011 (aged 86); Miami, Florida
- Education: Universidad de la Habana
- Occupation: Architect
- Parent(s): Nicolás Quintana Arango; Carmen Gómez Diaz
- Practice: Moenck & Quintana
- Buildings: Hotel Cabañas de Sol; Varadero Yacht Club Residential Condominum; National Bank of Cuba; Hotel Club Kawama; Thang Loi Hotel; Roberto Clemete Coliseum; Ashford Terraces Condominium

Nicolás Quintana (January 26, 1925 – May 31, 2011) was a Cuban-born architect and one of the frontrunners of modernist architecture in Cuba.

== Early life ==
Nicolás José Braulio del Carmen Quintana y Gómez Arango Díaz was born on January 26, 1925, in Havana, Cuba. Quintana was the son of a prominent Cuban architect, Nicolás Quintana Arango and Carmen Gómez Diaz. He lived his early years in Vedado and later in Miramar.

Following in his father's footsteps, he enrolled at the School of Architecture at the University of Havana. He was one of the architectural students who participated in the "Burning of the Viñolas" event in the courtyard of the School of Architecture's library in 1944.

== Career ==
After his father died in 1950, he graduated and became co-director of Moenck & Quintana in February 1951. In less than a decade he designed two dozen projects which consisted mostly of private houses and resorts.

Quintana formally represented Cuba at the Congrès Internationaux d'Architecture Moderne in Aix-en-Provence in 1953 and Dubrovnik in 1956.

Following the establishment of the National Planning Board in 1955, he oversaw the master plans for the cities of Varadero and Trinidad as a director of Public Works.

In 1958, he was commissioned to design and build the new National Bank of Cuba building in Havana. When the revolution triumphed in 1959, Quintana was accused of being a conspirator by Che Guevara and he was given three options for punishment: exile, incarceration, or the firing squad. He firmly ended his career in Cuba by choosing exile. On January 8, 1960, he was forced into exile following the Castro revolution. He moved to Venezuela and then Puerto Rico where he continued work as an architect, before eventually settling down in Miami by the 1980s.

== Teaching career ==
Quintana began his teaching career in the Department of Architecture at Florida International University in 1986, where he taught until 2010. He retired as professor emeritus for health reasons.

== Death ==
Nicolás Quintana died in Miami, Florida, on May 31, 2011.
