= Hotel Habana Riviera =

Hotel in Havana, Cuba

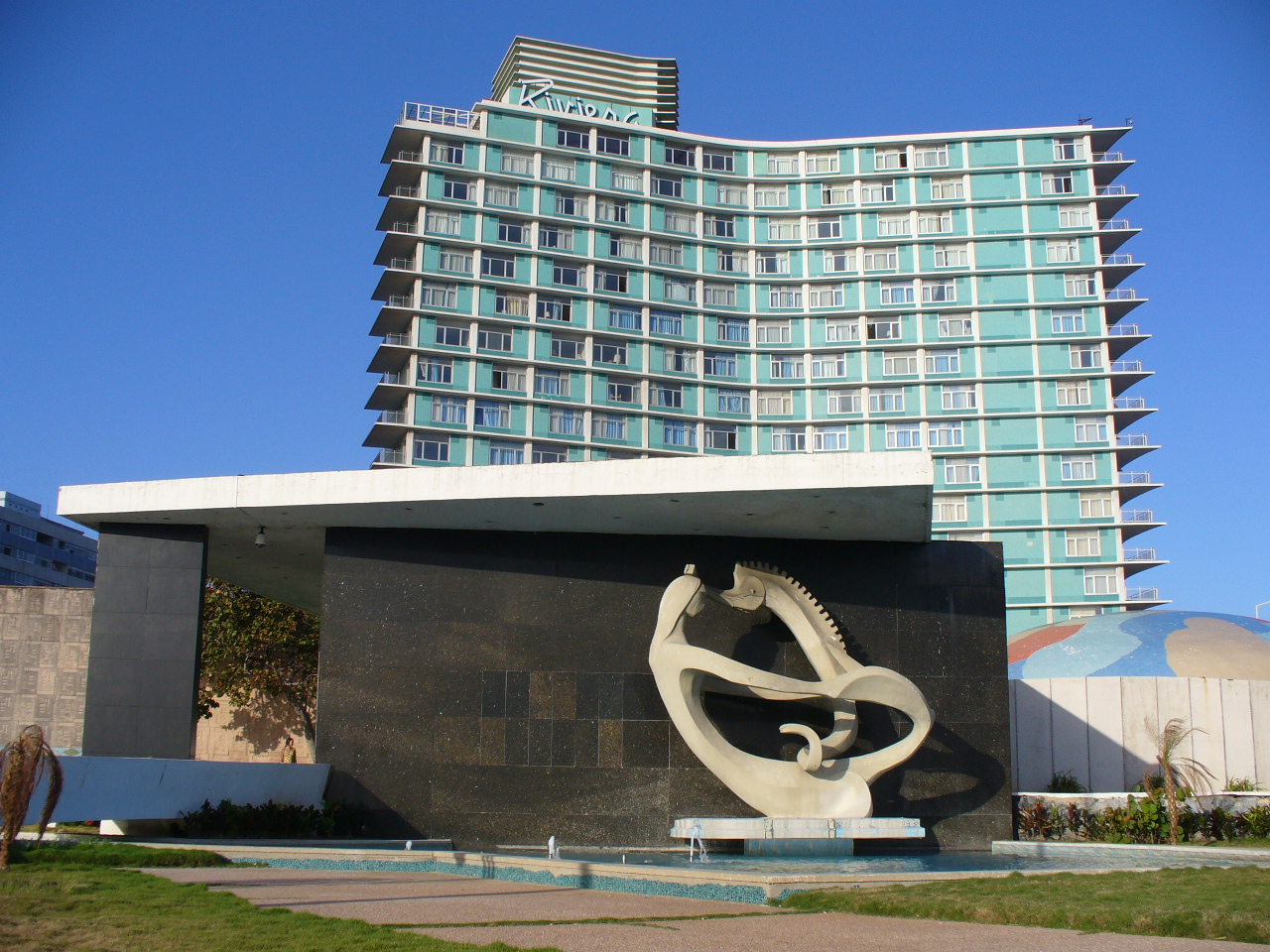
- Hotel Habana Riviera (2007)
- Interactive map of the Hotel Habana Riviera area

General information
- Location: Paseo y Malecón; Havana, Cuba
- Coordinates: 23.1397°N 82.4040°W
- Opening: December 10, 1957
- Owner: Gran Caribe Grupo Hotelero

Technical details
- Floor count: 21

Design and construction
- Architect: Igor B. Polevitzky
- Other designers: Albert Parvin (interiors)

Other information
- Number of rooms: 352

The Hotel Habana Riviera, originally known as the Havana Riviera, is a historic resort hotel located on the Malecón waterfront boulevard in the Vedado district of Havana, Cuba. The hotel was built in 1957 and still maintains its original 1950s style. It has 21 floors containing 352 rooms, all of which feature views of the water and the Vedado neighborhood.

== History ==
=== Construction ===
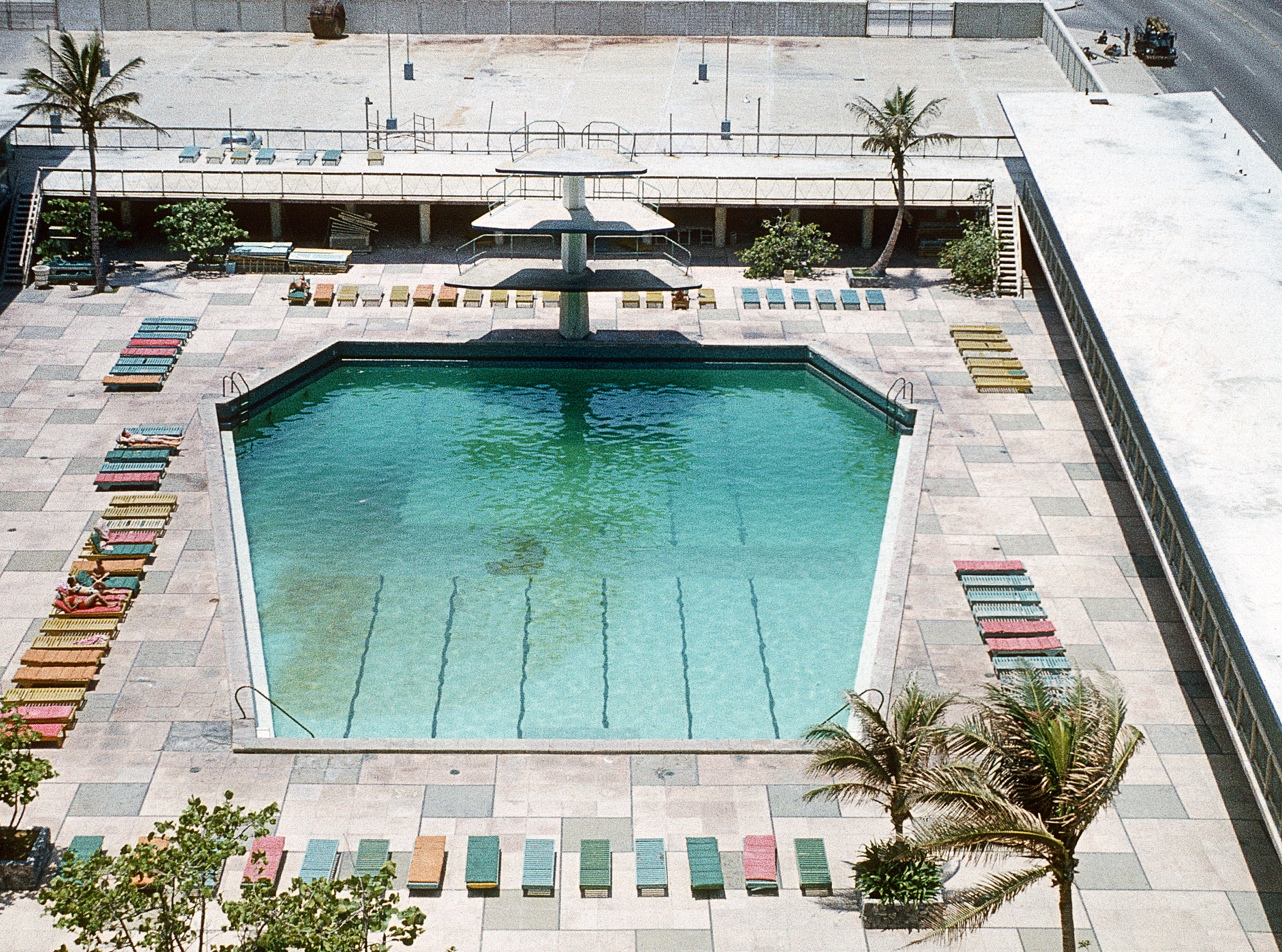
The pool from above c. 1973

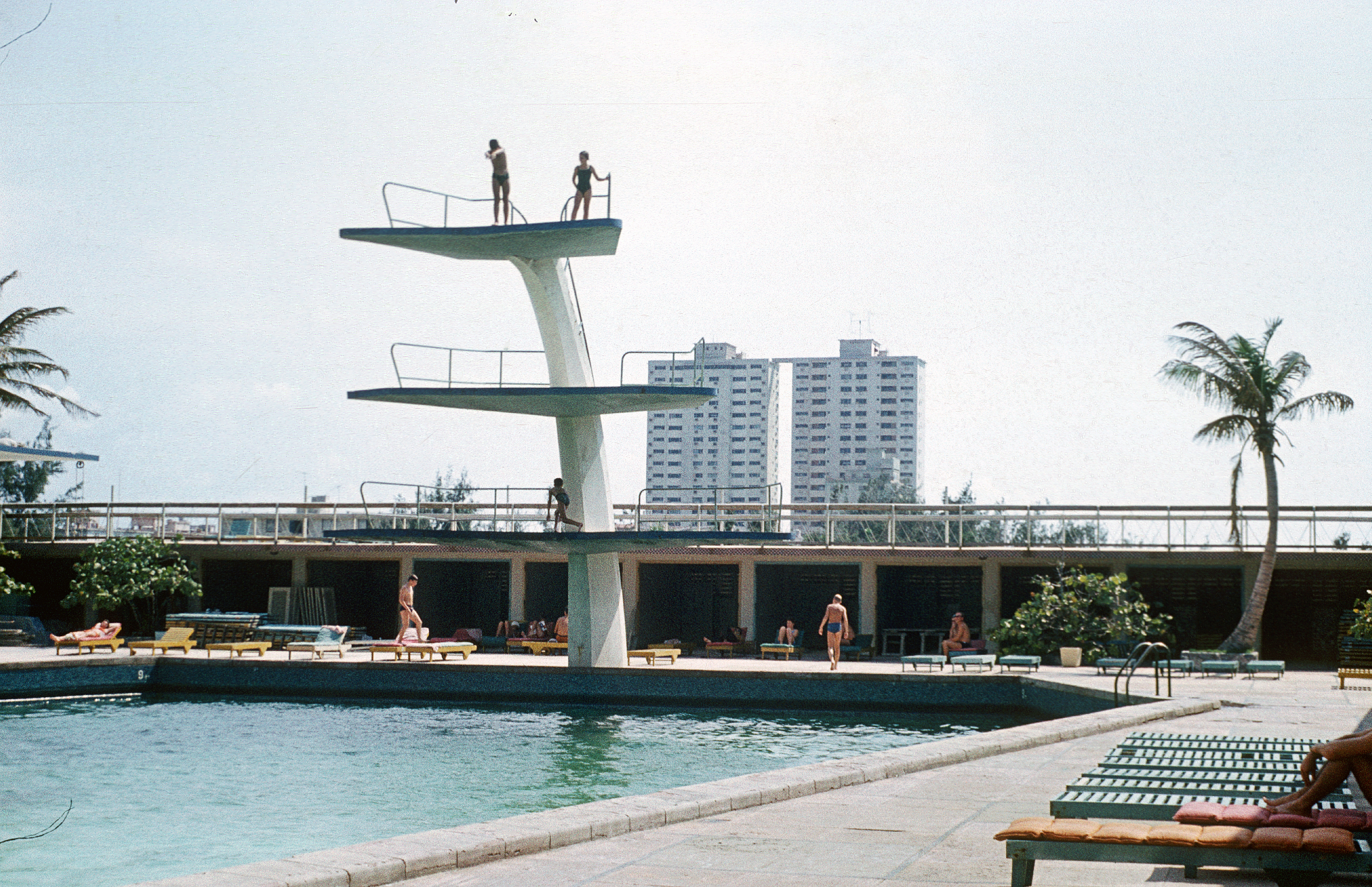
Cabanas and the three-level diving platform c. 1973

The Havana Riviera was originally owned by mobster Meyer Lansky, who had been inspired to build it after visiting the nine-storey Riviera Casino, owned by his friend Moe Dalitz, on the Las Vegas Strip. It was intended to rival the comfort and contemporary luxury of any Las Vegas hotel of the era. Lansky chose to build in Havana because he did not want to be subject to US laws or the scrutiny of the FBI. The hotel was officially operated by Riviera de Cuba SA, established in 1956. The original incorporation papers also listed the names of certain "Miami hotel operators", a Canadian textile company, and several others. It was built at a cost of US $8 million, most of which was provided by the Bank for Economic and Social Development (BANDES), a state-run development bank set up by then President Fulgencio Batista.

Lansky's investment partners included some of Las Vegas's most influential figures. Besides Dalitz were his old friends Morris Kleinman, Sam Tucker, and Wilbur Clark of the Desert Inn (and Lansky's Hotel Nacional casino); Ed Levinson of the Fremont Hotel; Charles "Babe" Baron, representing Sam Giancana's interests; and Hyman Abrams and Morris Rosen of the Flamingo Las Vegas (of Bugsy Siegel fame). As with all of Lansky’s dealings, he and his associates’ ownership of the Riviera was hidden behind layers of managers and frontmen.

In selecting an architect for the Riviera, Lansky initially approached Wayne McAllister, the prolific Los Angeles–based designer of Las Vegas's Desert Inn, Fremont, and Sands hotels—all properties controlled by Lansky’s associates in the Cleveland Gang. However, Lansky's insistence that the hotel be completed in less than six months led McAllister to decline the offer. Instead, Igor Boris Polevitzky, one of the leading figures of Miami Modern architecture, took the job, with Irving Feldman, who had a dozen prestigious hotels and apartment blocks to his credit in Miami Beach, serving as the project's general contractor. Original blueprints of the hotel were made in Miami by the Feldman Construction Corporation, as well as by the Cuban-based architect Manuel Carrera Machado.

Lansky then hired Albert B. Parvin of Los Angeles to design the hotel's original décor. Parvin was an interior decorator who had laid carpets in many of the large hotels in Las Vegas. His main occupation was operating the Flamingo, a post he held between 1955 and 1960; nine years after Lansky himself agreed to Lucky Luciano's demands that a hit be put out on the casino's would-be original operator Bugsy Siegel at the Havana Conference. Lansky also hired two of Cuba’s artists, muralist Rolando Lopez Dirube and sculptor Florencio Gelabert, who designed the white marble sculptures of an intertwined mermaid and swordfish that front the porte cochère, and "Ritmo Cubano" (Cuban Rhythm), a large lobby sculpture that depicts twirling male and female dancers rendered in bronze. Together, the three men captured the marine outdoor atmosphere.

Work began on the site of a former sports arena in December 1956, in the midst of revolutionary upheaval. Already envisioned as "The Riviera of the Caribbean", the hotel was considered the epitome of resort construction and one of the more costly hotels in Cuba. It was also the first in Havana to have air-conditioned rooms. Each room had a view of the Gulf of Mexico. The hotel was not only near downtown Havana but also close to residential Miramar and Country Club.

=== Opening and famous guests ===
When the Havana Riviera opened on December 10, 1957, it was the largest purpose-built casino-hotel in the world outside Las Vegas (the Havana Hilton surpassed its size a few months later). The opening act that night at the Copa Cabaret was Ginger Rogers and her music revue directed by Jack Cole. Lansky complained that Rogers could "wiggle her ass, but she can't sing a goddam note!" Within days the hotel became a symbol in Havana, attracting such acts as Abbott and Costello and Steve Allen, who taped an episode of his prime-time Sunday night show, The Steve Allen Show, from the hotel featuring Mamie Van Doren swimming in the pool. Other celebrated guests included William Holden, diva Jean Fenn, Nat King Cole, and Ava Gardner, who was rumored to have dragged a bellhop into her bed.

After the hotel was finished, Lansky installed himself in the Presidential Suite on the top floor as his command post, appointing Harry Smith, a prominent hotelman from Toronto, as president of the hotel and T. James Ennis, who was well known in Cuba hotel circles, as the managing director. Lansky's official title was kitchen director, but he controlled every aspect of the hotel, especially the casino, which was operated by Frank Erickson, Giordino Cellini, Ed Levenson, and Dusty Peters. He had initially appointed Dino Cellini from Ohio to run the casino but replaced him with Erickson, who was serving as Frank Costello’s representative in Cuba. The Cuban Herminio Díaz García was appointed head of security at the casino. Since Cubans had never been trained for gambling operations on such a large scale, pit bosses, dealers, and stickmen were brought from the US as "technicians" and in that category were allowed to stay on two-year visas. These men, veterans of the working class of illicit US gambling, eventually turned into tutors for the Cubans. The casino would make over $3 million in its first four months of operation.

=== Revolution ===
Unfortunately for Lansky, the Cuban Revolution caused all Americans' properties in Cuba to be seized. His health declining by this point, Lansky chartered a plane that same New Year's Eve headed for the Bahamas. With him went his dream of being at the center of Cuba's gambling operations.

On January 22, 1959, Fidel Castro held a press conference at the Copa Cabaret inside the hotel, where he gave his response to the world with regard to the Cuban Revolution. In October of the following year he nationalized all the island's hotel-casinos and outlawed gambling.

In October 1960 the hotel was nationalized by the Cuban government.

=== Today ===
The hotel still maintains the famous Palacio de la Salsa Club, where salsa bands regularly perform.

The Tampa Tribune reported in December 2015 that Lansky's heirs, who still live in the Tampa, Florida, area, are seeking restitution for the Cuban government's confiscation of the hotel. They did not file a claim for damages with the Foreign Claims Settlement Commission, however.

The hotel was operated for many years by the Gran Caribe chain, a Cuban state-owned company. On December 10, 2016, it was announced that Iberostar Hotels & Resorts, a Spanish chain, would assume management of the hotel in 2017. The hotel was renamed the Hotel Habana Riviera by Iberostar. In 2018, Iberostar announced plans to invest €35 million in renovations. In 2026, due the Crisis in Cuba, Iberostar ceased all operations in Cuba and severed their relationship with the hotel.
