= Igor B. Polevitzky =

American architect (1911 - 1978)

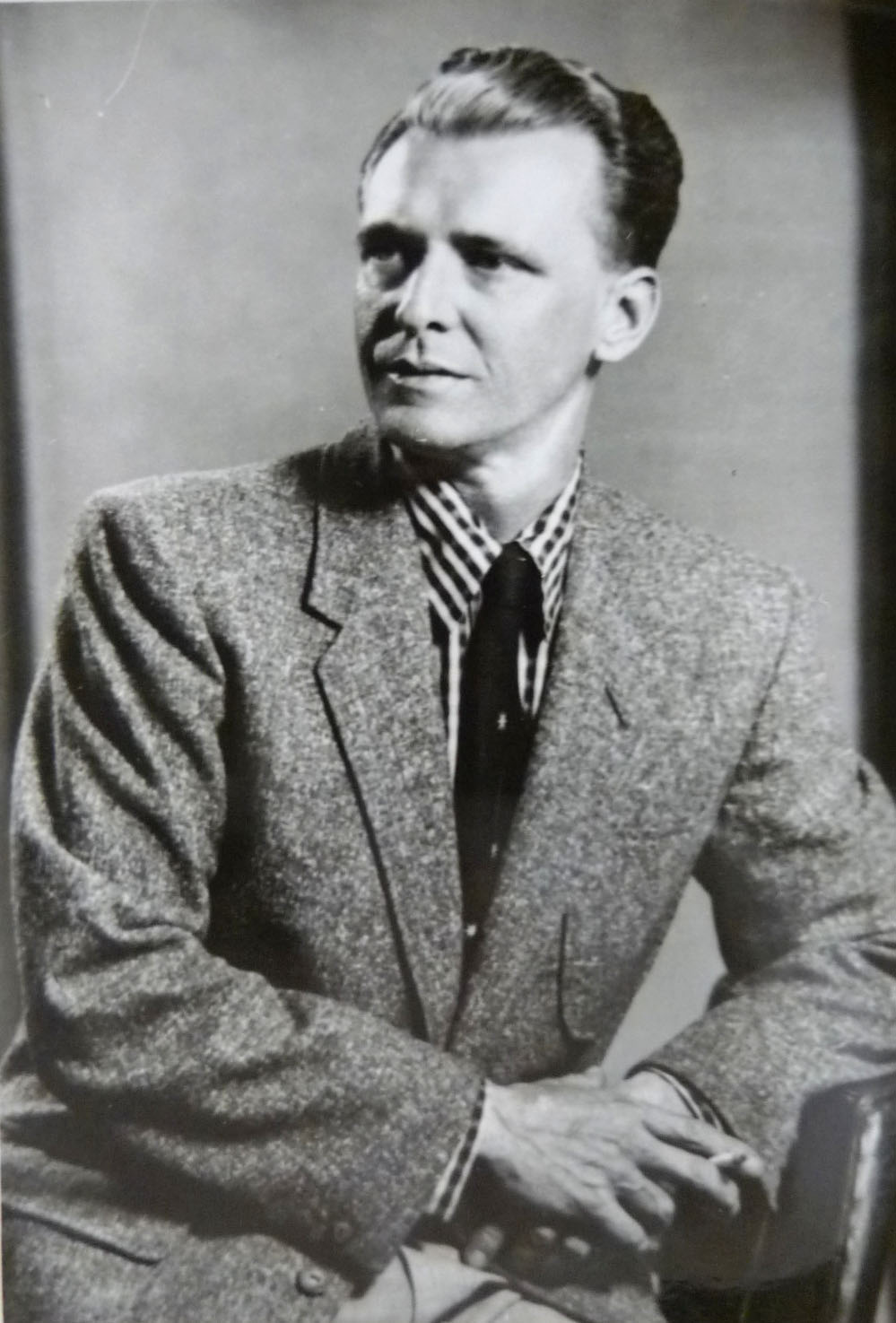
- Igor B. Polevitzky
- Born: May 21, 1911; St. Petersburg, Russia
- Died: May 5, 1978 (aged 66)
- Education: University of Pennsylvania
- Occupation: Architect
- Practice: Polevitzky, Johnson & Associates
- Buildings: Gulf Service Station and Hotel; Albion Building; Shelborne Hotel; Birdcage House; Sea Tower; Hotel Habana Riviera

Igor B. Polevitzky (June 21, 1911 – May 5, 1978) was an American architect, most recognized for his contribution to the architectural styling of Miami Beach hotels, residences and the development of the tropical modern home in South Florida.

Born in St. Petersburg, Russia on June 21, 1911, Igor Polevitzky was the son of Russian electrical engineer Boris Alexander Polevitzky and Katherine Polevitzky, a physician and microbiologist. In November 1922, the family immigrated to the United States as it is believed the father had some involvement with the Russian Revolution.

Polevitzky's mother Katherine, immediately received a research position at the University of Pennsylvania, Philadelphia, where Igor was able to attend in 1929. His father received a position at General Electric through a friend. Although he originally studied civil engineering for a year and a half, he was directed to the school of architecture where he studied under the well-known architect and critic of Modern Classicism, Paul Philippe Cret; who was credited for having major influence on Igor. Polevitzky graduated cum laude in 1934 when the school remained Beaux-Arts throughout his stay.

Upon his graduation in 1934, Polevitzky moved to Miami to help design a house for a friend and began what would become his career focus on tropical design. Working with other modernists of the time in Miami, Robert Law Weed and classmate Thomas Triplett Russell (who graduated from the University of Pennsylvania in 1935), the firm began to bring a new Modernist approach to Miami and Miami Beach. At the time in Miami, the effects of the Great Depression had begun to pass and the city was beginning to boom with population growth, tourism and a new regionalist architecture. The style was a response to the specific demands of the south Florida coastal climate by using innovative passive cooling design strategies. "This singular integration of concepts of Modernism and regionalism defines the nature of Polevitzky's contribution to the aesthetic of the region.

World War II hindered construction and the progression of architectural implementation in the region, when Igor was required to take a job as Chief Engineer for the Army Air Force. Upon his return, he opened a new office where he formed a partnership with Verner Johnson, and so began in 1951, Polevitzky, Johnson and Associates in Miami. Long-time associates of the firm included William H. Arthur, Samuel S. Block, Jerome L. Schilling and illustrator J. M. Smith. Often-employed photographers included Robert R. Blanch, Jim Forney, Samuel H. Gottscho, Ernest Graham, Rudi Rada, Ezra Stoller and Earl Struck.

The constant theme in the Polevitzky's work was termed as an "envelope for living," which is characteristic of the many projects throughout Igor's career. One key concept maintained by Polevitzky through most of his career was the almost ambiguous blending of interior and exterior spaces which helped to relate the home to its immediate environment. Simple considerations like the sloping of roofs and extending overhangs on houses proved well suited for the intense sun and rain in tropical Miami. Then in 1939, Polevitzky introduced what he later termed, "the four stages of indoor-outdoor living" where his plans began to have a progression from the living room, to the dining room, into a screened porch and then outside; this became a common tool in his designs in years to come.

Polevitzky designed more than 500 buildings during his Miami career.

== Havana Riviera ==
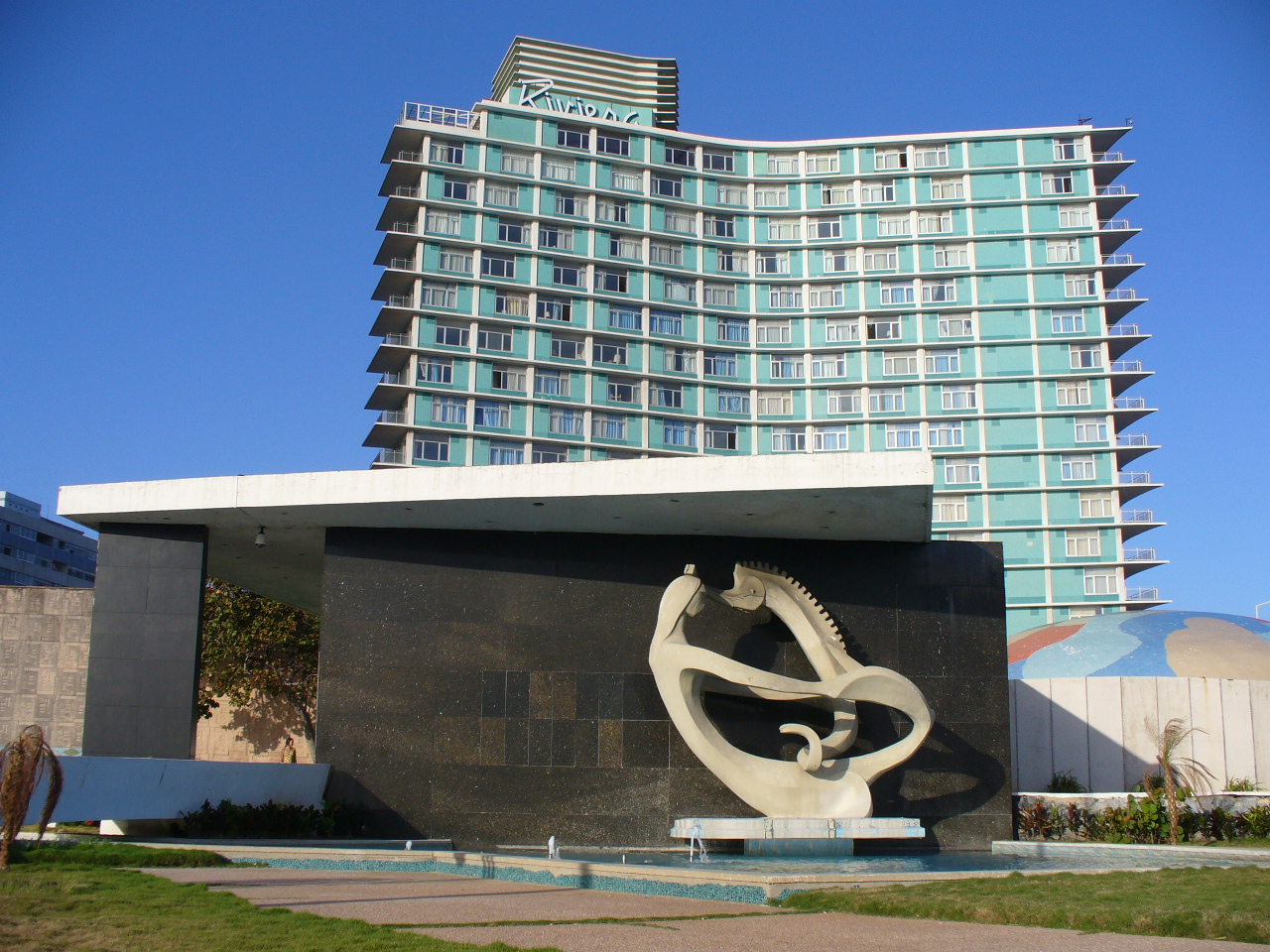
Hotel Riviera, 1957.

The Hotel Havana Riviera was originally commissioned by its promoter Meyer Lansky to be located on a traffic island near a high-income neighborhood along the Malecón (a boardwalk that runs along the coast of Havana), and was to be designed by eminent architect Philip C. Johnson, then by Los Angeles architect Wayne McAllister. The original project was called the Hotel Monaco and was designed in 1956. "According to the architect [Johnson], the project remained un-built because the demands of the promoter Meyer Lansky were impossible to meet." Lansky quickly seeks Polevitzky, Johnson, and Associates in Miami where Igor offers to meet Lansky's unusual demands, and takes over the project.

Considered Polevitzky's most influential project, the Havana Riviera was designed and constructed in six months. It was the culmination of all of his years of tropical regionalism and his experience in hotel design; yet it wasn't even in the city that he spent his career addressing. The hotel was one of the last great developments in Havana before the Cuban Revolution in 1959, and the first international project for the firm.

With the popularization of air-conditioning, many of his teachings were abandoned by the public in lieu of enclosed boxes of contained comfort. Alan T. Shulman, professor at the University of Miami explains,

"Cosmopolitan, well-educated, analytically minded, but somewhat diffident, Polevitzky was one of the most respected but least appreciated of Miami architects. His work was considered intellectual and avant-garde, and although he was well published, he seems to have made little effort to explain or popularize his approach. Thus, his adventure in evolving an architecture for Florida was an inherently personal one."

Igor's own reaction to the Miami climate; he had a skin allergy that ironically kept him in air-conditioning most of the time forces him to move to a motel he owned in Estes Park, Colorado in the early sixties. Partially disabled and reliant on a wheelchair from a cruise ship accident, Polevitzky dies in 1978, suffering from severe burns and smoke inhalation from a dropped match in his home. The predominance of Modernism in Miami tailored to the tropical climate is still very visible today, and in the 1950s, Polevitzky and Johnson were at the forefront.

== Projects ==
Selected works:

- Gulf Service Station and Hotel, Miami, Florida, 1936
- The Euster Residence, Pine Tree Drive, Miami Beach, 1936
- The Benson Residence, Miami, Florida, 1937
- Sailing Baruch Residence (the Tropotype House), Miami, Florida, 1938
- Albion Building, Miami, Florida, 1939
- Saks Fifth Avenue Store. Lincoln Road, Miami Beach, Florida, 1939
- Shelborne Hotel, Miami, Florida, 1940
- Center Hotel and Office Building (project), Miami, Florida, 1945
- Golden Strand Hotel, Miami, Florida, 1946
- Michael Heller Residence #1, Miami, Florida, 1947
- Michael Heller Residence #2 (Birdcage House), Miami, Florida, 1949
- Samuel E. Schulman Residence (the Porch House), Miami, Florida, 1950
- Sea Tower, Fort Lauderdale, Florida, 1957
- Hotel Habana Riviera, Havana, Cuba, 1957
- Sea View Realty, Miami, Florida, 1959
- Sunrise Tower, Fort Lauderdale, Florida 1962
