= Charles Baron =

American mobster (1907–1992)

Charles "Babe" Baron (1907–1992) was an organized crime figure in Chicago, Illinois. He owned a successful Chicago new car dealership (Charles Baron Ford) as well as holding the rank of brigadier general in the Illinois National Guard. He was involved in illegal gambling as a handbook operator for the Chicago Outfit.

Along with Dave Yaras and Lenny Patrick, Baron served as a protégé to Democratic Party ward boss Jacob Arvey. He was also a close associate of Patrick Hoy, a Henry Crown employee of General Dynamics who was later able to arrange a job for Sidney Korshak at the Hilton Hotels.

Twice arrested for murder, including that of bootlegger James Walsh, whom he shot and killed following a prize fight in 1929, and of North Side Gang financier "Smiling" Gus Winkler, on October 9, 1933. Baron was identified as an associate of John Roselli during the Kefauver Hearings, in the 1950s.

A former general manager of Meyer Lansky's Havana Riviera in pre-revolutionary Cuba, Baron was one of the first to be granted a gaming license by the Gaming Control Act, in 1960, and served as the official greeter of the Sands Hotel and Casino, in Las Vegas, under Joseph "Doc" Stacher.
