= Casino Español de La Habana =

Casino Español de la Habana
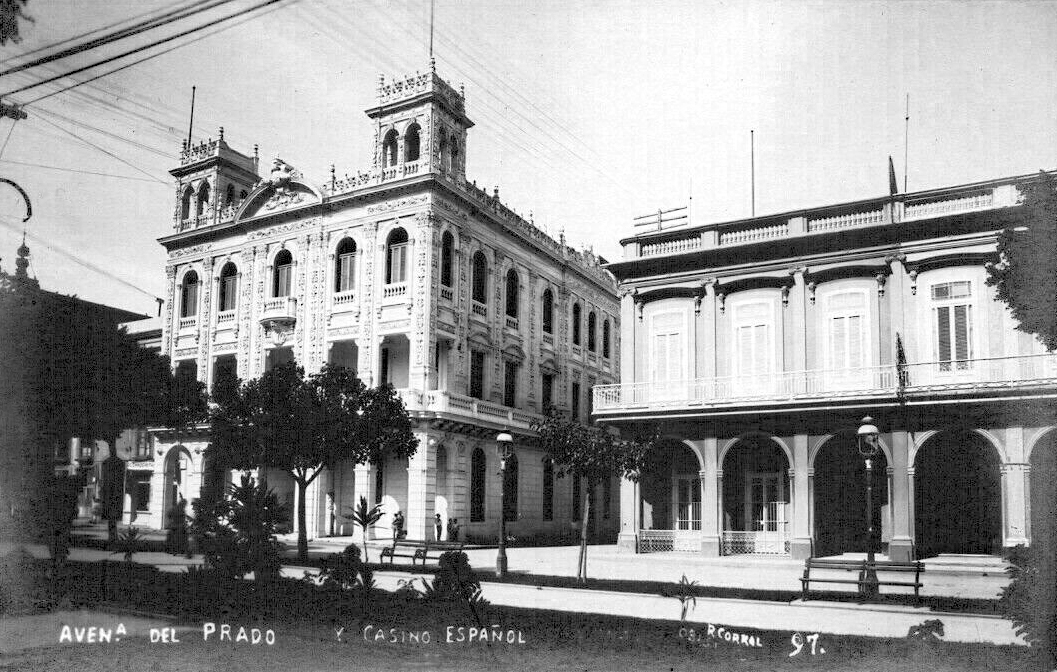
- Interactive map of the Casino Español de la Habana area
- Alternative names: Spanish Casino

General information
- Architectural style: Renaissance Revival architecture
- Location: Marianao, Havana, La Habana Province, Cuba
- Coordinates: 23°8′22.42″N 82°21′34.03″W

Casino Español de La Habana, commonly known as Casino Español or the Spanish Casino, was one of Havana's largest clubs. It was established in the 1860s by Spanish emigrants residing in Cuba as their sole recreational and social facility.

== Early history ==
Early records show that Captain-General De Rodas made a speech formalizing the foundation of the Casino Español in Havana on August 17, 1869.

It was located in the Marianao area of Havana. By 1886, the club boasted white marble floors, a ballroom for formal events, and a stage built for orchestras. Along with dining options, a swimming pool, a gymnasium, and tennis and racketball courts, there was also a baseball field.

Following the Cuban revolution, the recreational center was nationalized and renamed the José Ramón Rodríguez Social Worker Circle.
