= Rolando López Dirube =

Cuban-born Puerto Rican artist (1928 - 1997)

- Born: August 14, 1928; Havana, Cuba
- Died: January 23, 1997 (aged 68); Puerto Rico
- Education: Colegio La Salle
- Known for: Painting, sculpture, printmaking
- Notable work: El maestro Rolando López Dirube: 40 años de labor creativa
- Style: Expressionism
- Movement: Expressionism
- Parents: Rolando López (father); Ofelia Dirube (mother)

Rolando López Dirube (August 14, 1928 – January 23, 1997), the son of Rolando López and Ofelia Dirube, was a Cuban artist who died in Puerto Rico, where he had lived for many years, at the age of 69.

He was born in Havana, became deaf at the age of eight, and completed high school in the Colegio La Salle. López Dirube then began studying engineering but quit after starting to paint and draw on his own. By the age of twenty he was exhibiting his art works in the Havana Lyceum. López Dirube also took up sculpting in wood and stone. He briefly studied art in the United States in 1949 and returned there as a political exile in 1960 before eventually settling in Cataño, Puerto Rico.

López Dirube was an important contributor to the development of fine arts in Puerto Rico. Apart from painting, he carved sculptures in wood and stone. His graphic work includes excellent wood engravings in wood, lithographs, silkscreens, etchings, and drawings in several techniques.

He was one of the most significant Cuban artists of the century, as was shown in Caracas when the Caracas Museum of Contemporary Art held an exhibition of his work.

A book entitled El maestro Rolando López Dirube : 40 años de labor creativa was published to accompany an exhibition in 1997 at the Museo de Arte Contemporáneo de Puerto Rico.
