= Havana Biltmore Yacht and Country Club =

Country club

Havana Biltmore Yacht and Country Club Club de Yates y Campo Biltmore de La Habana
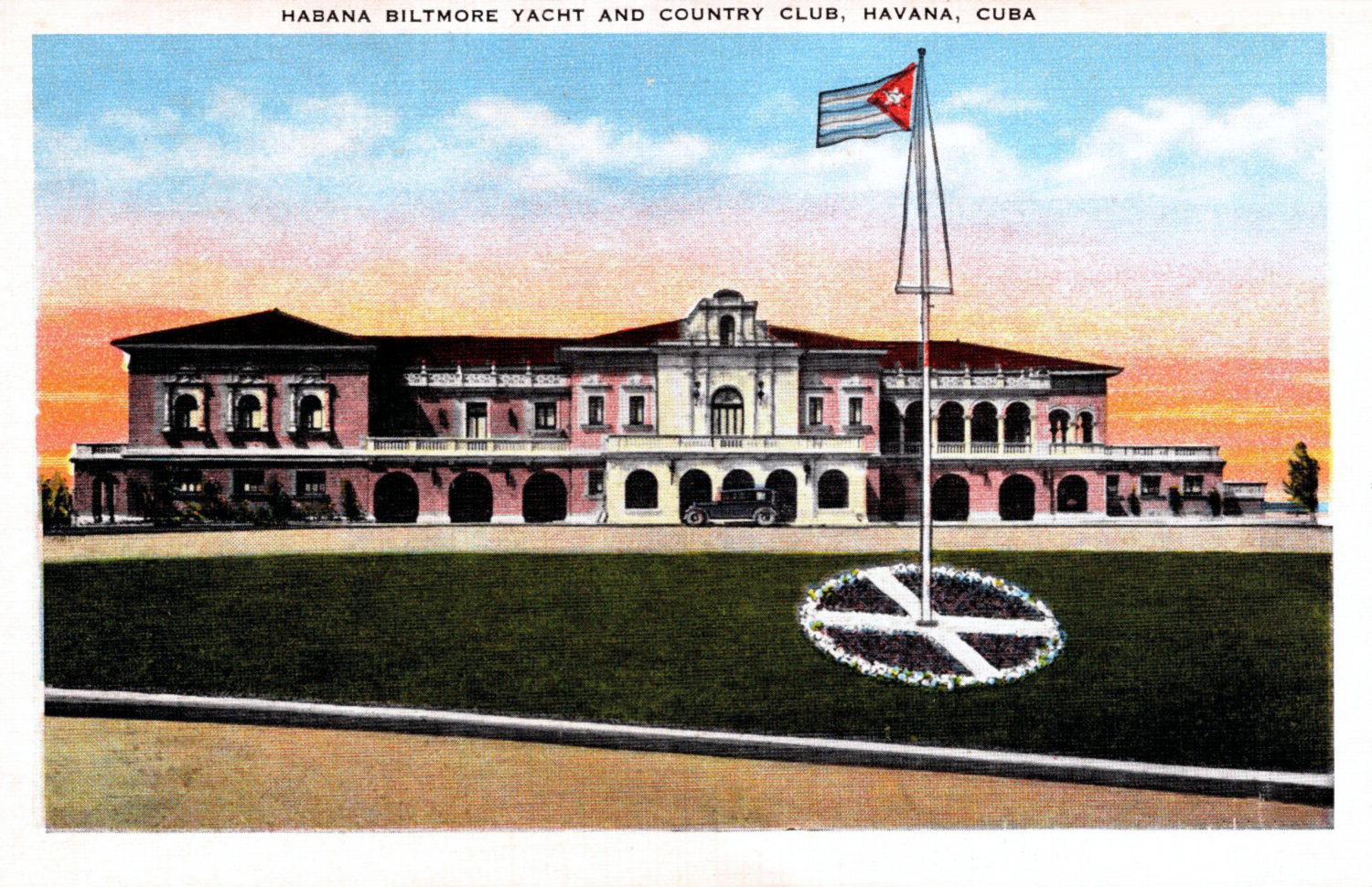
- Interactive map of the Havana Biltmore Yacht and Country Club; Club de Yates y Campo Biltmore de La Habana area
- Alternative names: Biltmore Yacht Club; Club Náutico Biltmore

General information
- Location: Miramar, Havana, La Habana Province, Cuba
- Coordinates: 23°5′27.54″N 82°28′35.09″W
- Opened: February 1, 1928

Design and construction
- Architecture firm: Moenck & Quintana

Havana Biltmore Yacht and Country Club, now Club Havana (Spanish: Club Habana), was an exclusive sports and country club in Havana, Cuba.

== Early history ==
In 1911, the early foundation of the complex was established in the Miramar suburb of Playa municipality of Havana.

The main clubhouse of the complex was developed in the mid-to-late 1920s and established as the Havana Biltmore Yacht and Country Club by American hotelier John Bowman. The architectural firm Moenck & Quintana carried out the design and construction process. President Gerardo Machado laid the first stone of the center on February 1, 1927. It officially opened on February 1, 1928. The beachfront property was managed by the Bowman-Biltmore company.

The country club was a hub for amateur sports and was frequented by wealthy Americans and Havana's elite. Ernest Hemingway used to fish at the Biltmore Yacht Club.

Following the winter of 1957, Miami-based company Polevitzky, Johnson and Associates was commissioned to redesign the original 1920s-era structure but the Cuban Revolution prevented it from ever being constructed.

The Biltmore was confiscated on March 19, 1960, in the wake of the Cuban Revolution. Approximately 300 Americans were estimated to have lost their memberships and shares in the club when it was seized. The club was converted into a public school owned by the Cuban government.

In 1998, the establishment reopened as Club Havana.
