= Acropole Hotel =

Hotel in Khartoum, Sudan

Coordinates: 15.6048319°N 32.5293716°E

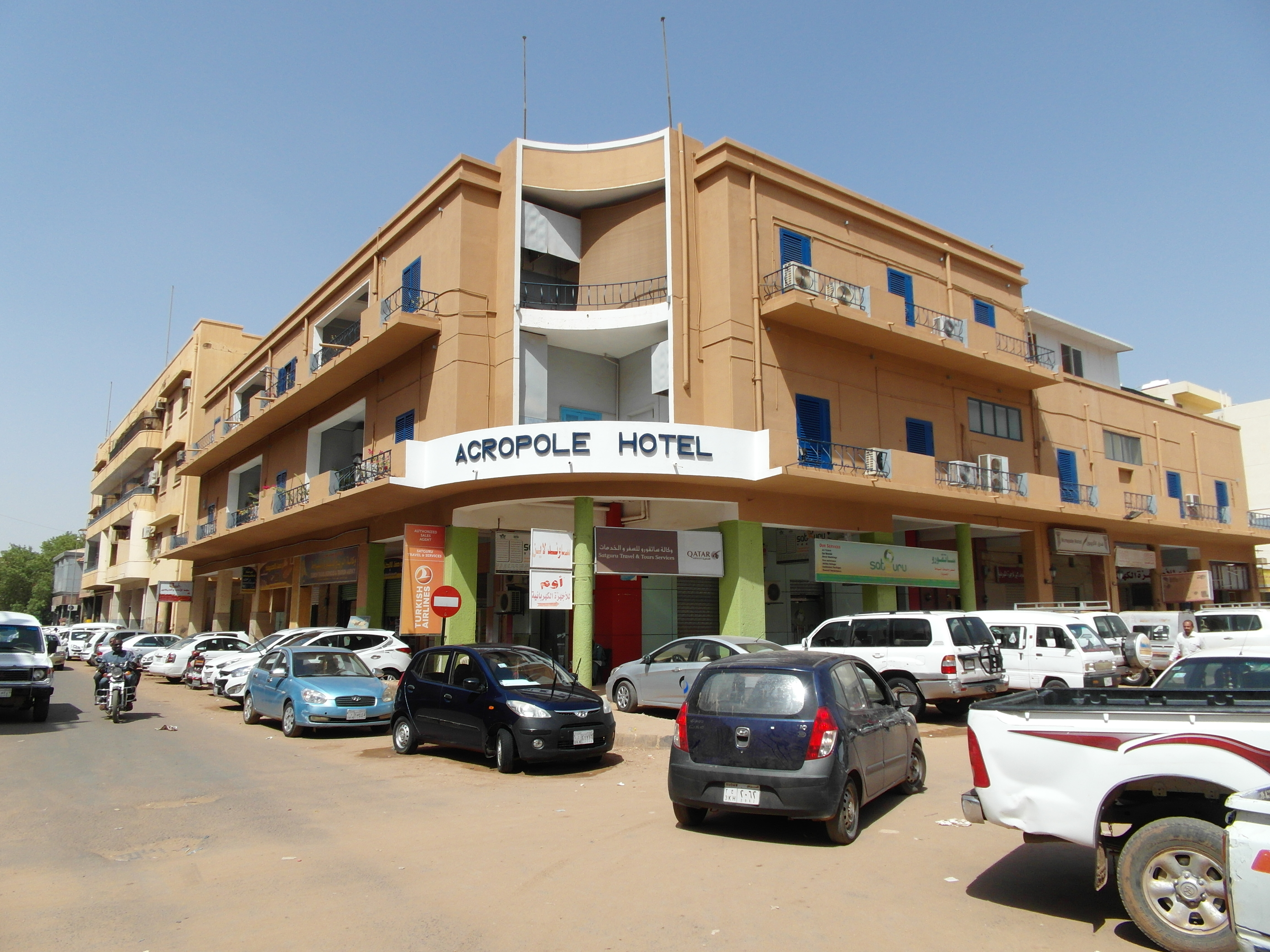
- Interactive map of the Acropole Hotel area

General information
- Location: Zubeir Pascha Street, Khartoum, Sudan
- Owner: Thanasis Pagoulatos (2016 – ) George Pagoulatos (until 2016)

Website
- acropolekhartoum.com

The Acropole is the oldest hotel in Khartoum, the capital of Sudan, since it was still established during the Anglo-Egyptian Condominium.

After Sudanese independence in 1956 the Greek-owned hotel weathered several regime changes and developed into a popular entry point and base for visiting journalists, humanitarians, diplomats, archaeologists and other researchers as well as overland travellers. The family-run business was in service without interruption until it was forced by the Sudanese civil war (2023-present) to close its doors.

== History ==
=== During the Anglo-Egyptian Condominium ===
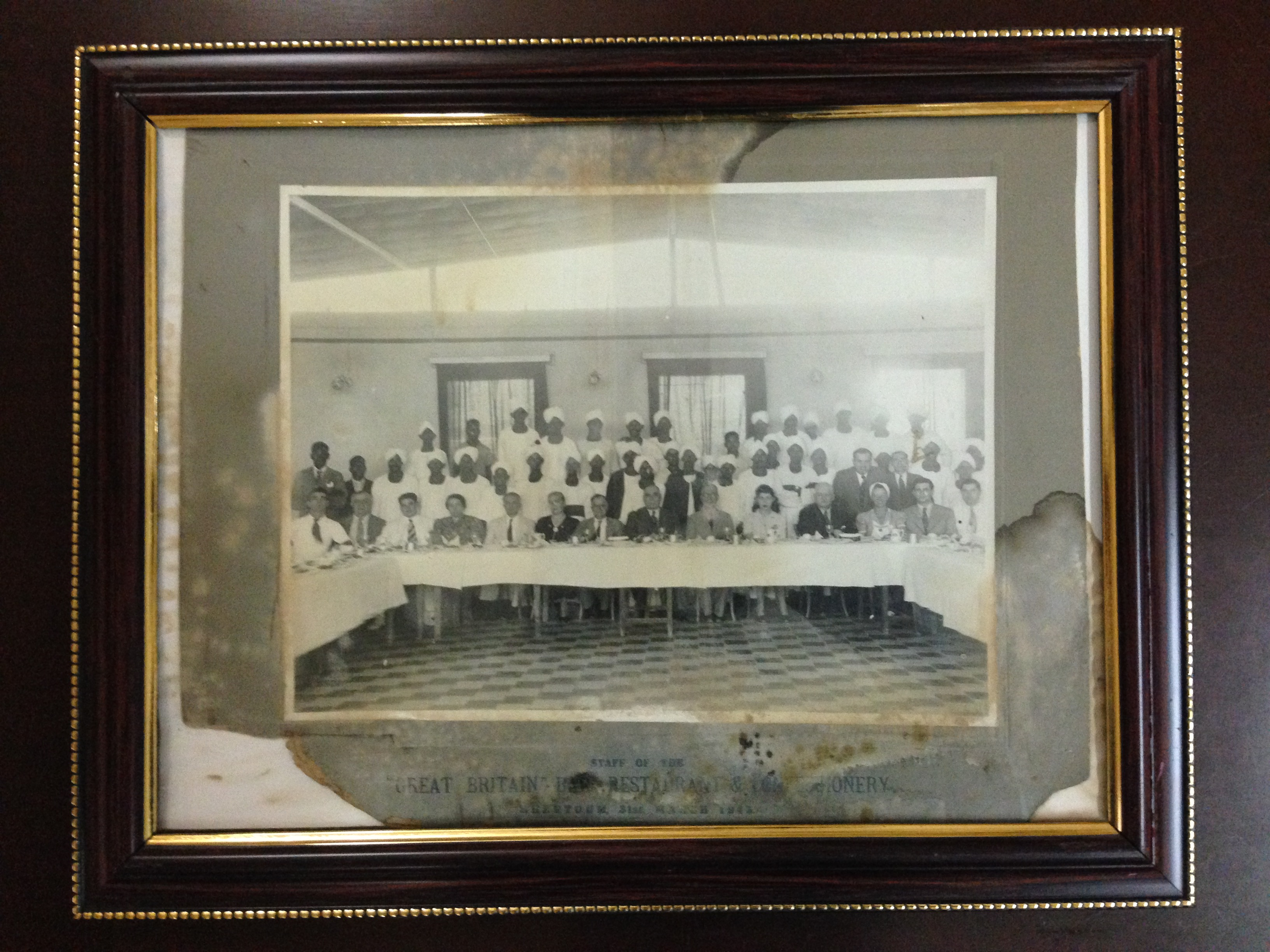
A photo from 1943 picturing the staff of the Great Britain Club on the wall of the Acropole's management office.

The Acropole was founded in 1952 by Panagiotis ("Panaghis") Pagoulatos from the village of Valsamata on the Ionian island of Cephalonia, who had left Greece during World War II, and his wife Flora, who was from the community of the Greeks in Egypt, specifically from Alexandria. Since there was a sizeable community of Greeks in Sudan at the time as well, the couple settled in the Anglo-Egyptian colony. The Washington Post writes:

"During the day, he was employed by the British government. After hours, he worked as a private accountant, soon amassing enough capital to open a night club just opposite the governor's palace".

When the British Governor-General Sir Alexander Knox Helm had the "Great Britain Bar" closed because of the noise, the couple took over a liquor dealership, opened a wine store, a confectionery shop, and then the Acropole, which at first had just ten rooms, but soon expanded. American author Robert D. Kaplan has called it

"a monument to the inventive cunning and shrewdness of the Greek trading community in Africa."

=== Since Sudanese Independence ===
When Sudan gained independence on 1 January 1956, the Greek settlers in the country were issued Sudanese nationality certificates and generally continued to thrive in the first few years of independence. Their numbers had increased by then to between 6,000 to 7,000. However, as political and economic turmoil grew, the number of Greeks in Sudan diminished by 1965 to 4,000.

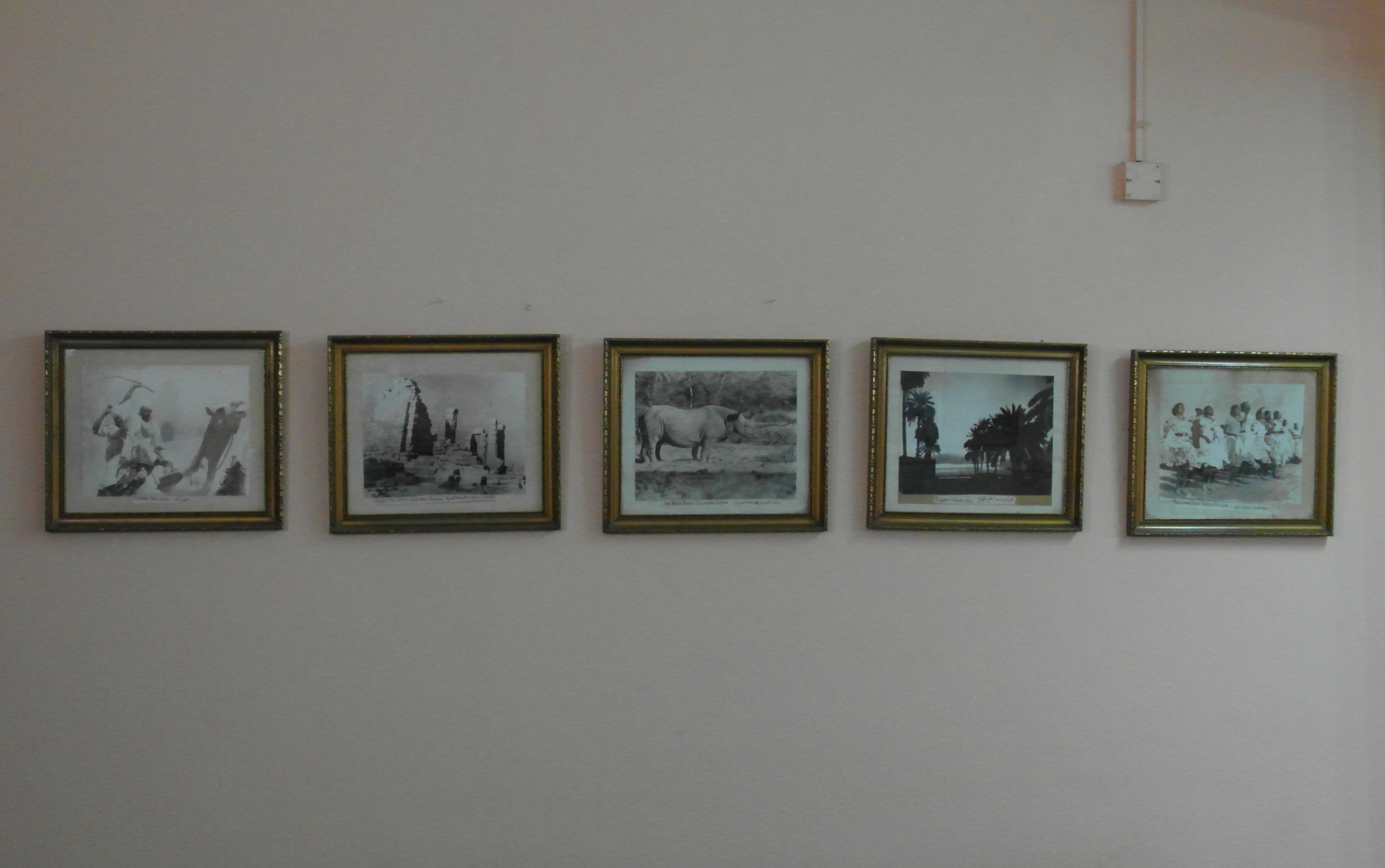
Gallery of historical images in the hotel restaurant (2015) with the photo of a now nearly extinct northern white rhinoceros in the centre.

This trend also affected the business of the Pagoulatos family: In 1967, the closed their confectionery shop after it was damaged in an anti-government protest. In the same year, Panagiotis Pagoulatos died and his three sons Athanasios ("Thanasis"), George, and Gerasimos (better known as "Makis" or "Mike", who was born in the Acropole) took over the business:

“With their mother’s guidance and their hard work, they managed to turn the hotel into an actual treasure of the city’s cultural and touristic life.”

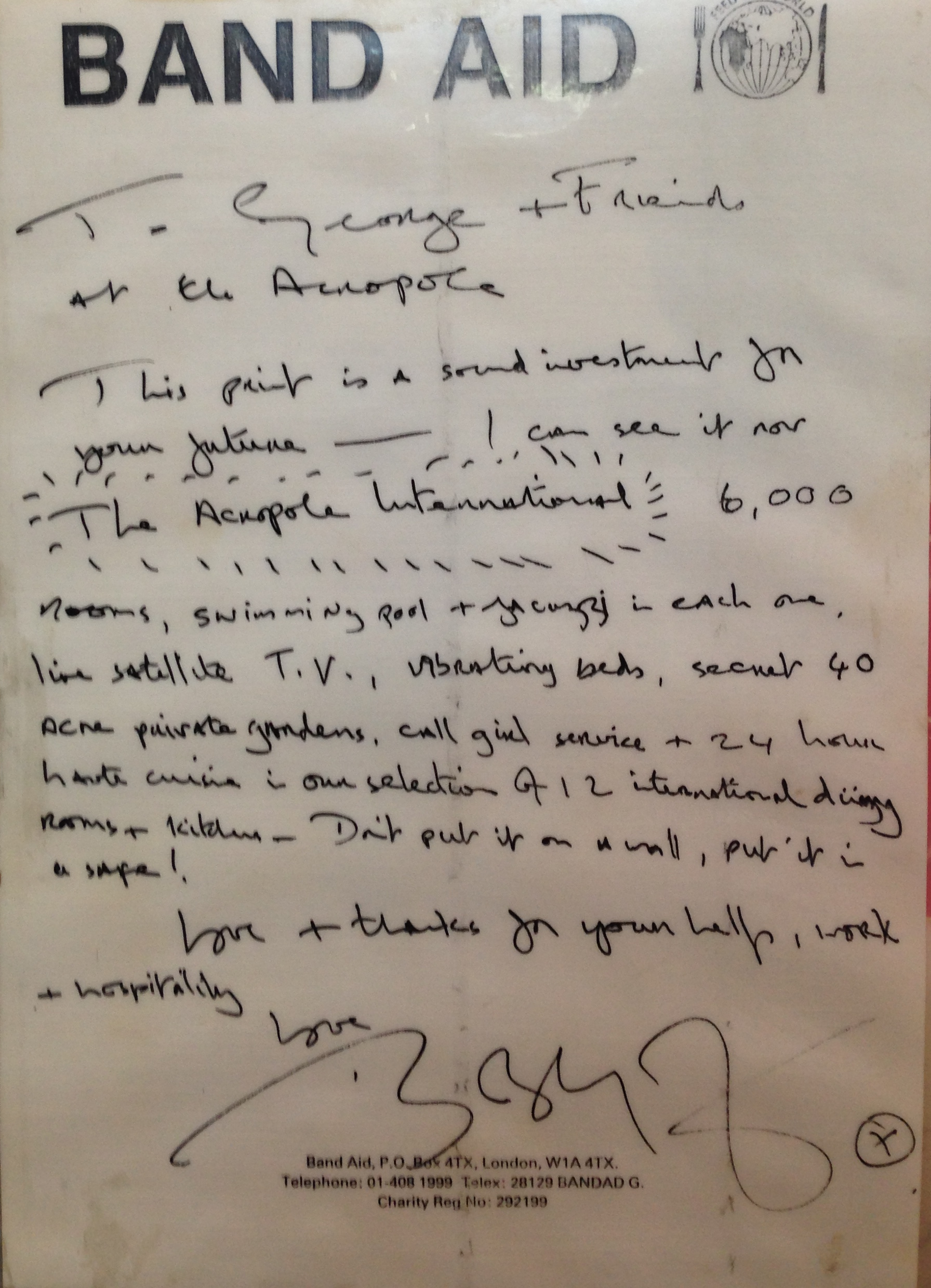
Geldof's letter: "Love + Thanks"

Unlike many other Greek-Sudanese enterprises, the Acropole was spared from the policies of nationalisation following the 1969 coup d'état, since it was housed in a rented building. It suffered from the worsening economic crisis, but profited from the pro-Western swing after the failed 1971 coup d'état by the Sudanese Communist Party.

In 1983 again, the Acropole lost part of its business, when president Gaafar Nimeiry introduced the draconic "September Laws" under the label of Sharia and had all beverages dumped into the Blue Nile. Until then, the Acropole had been the distributor of Amstel beer in the country. According to Robert D. Kaplan, the Pagoulatos-family was planning to give up the business and to leave Sudan following that loss.

Shortly afterwards, however, the 50-room hotel experienced an unprecedented influx of customers because of the devastating famines in Darfur and Ethiopia. It became the base for many international non-governmental organizations since it was the only hotel with reliable telephone, telex and fax lines. Kaplan even reasons that the whole relief effort may well have collapsed without the skills of the Pagoulatos-family to maneuver through Sudan's complex bureaucracy. Senior Associated Press correspondent Mort Rosenblum nicknamed the Acropole the "Emergency Palace". American journalist Edward Girardet compared it to Rick's Café Américain in the movie Casablanca. Others likened it to legendary hotels like the Pasaje in Havana during the Spanish–American War, the Florida in Madrid during the Spanish Civil War and the Scribe in Paris after the Liberation of France, or attributed "a Raiders of the Lost Ark vibe" to it. One of the most prominent clients at that time was Nobel Peace Prize laureate Mother Teresa. A framed letter from the Irish pop-star-turned-Band Aid founder Bob Geldof on the wall of the hotel office depicts his appreciation for the support by the Pagoulatos family and their staff.

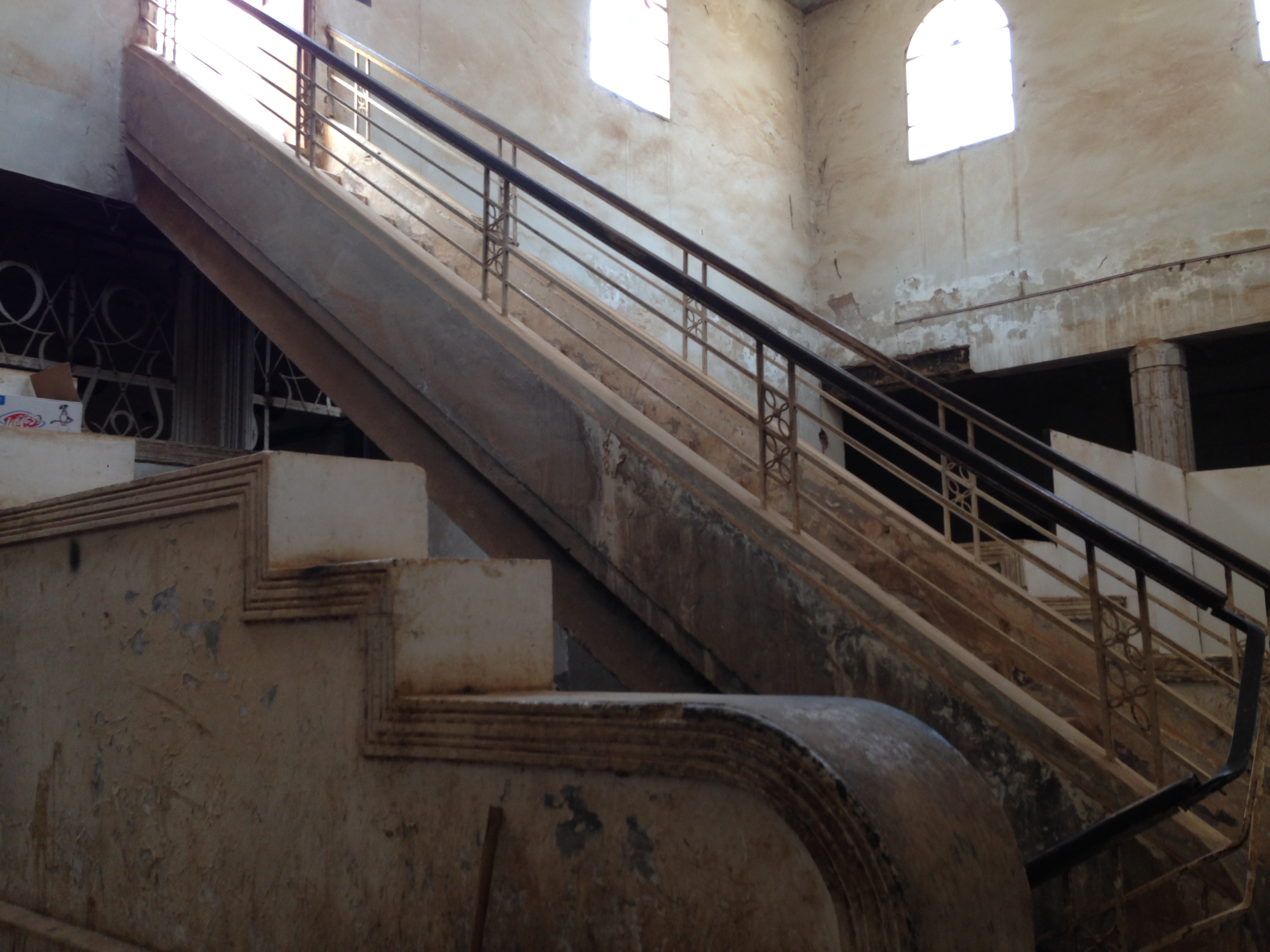
The Art Deco style entrance hall of the "totally unassuming" building that used to house the Acropole until 1988, photographed in 2018

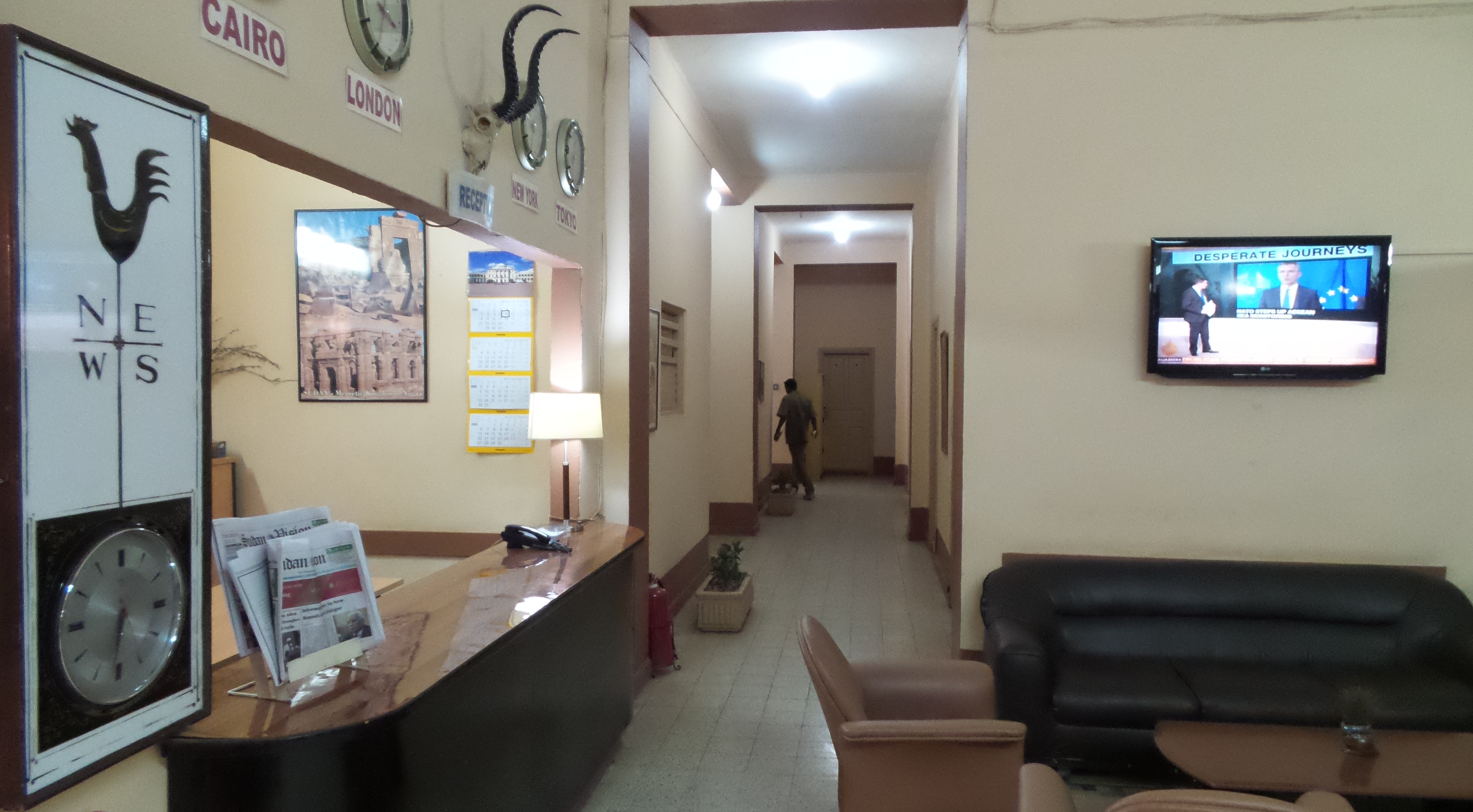
The reception in 2016

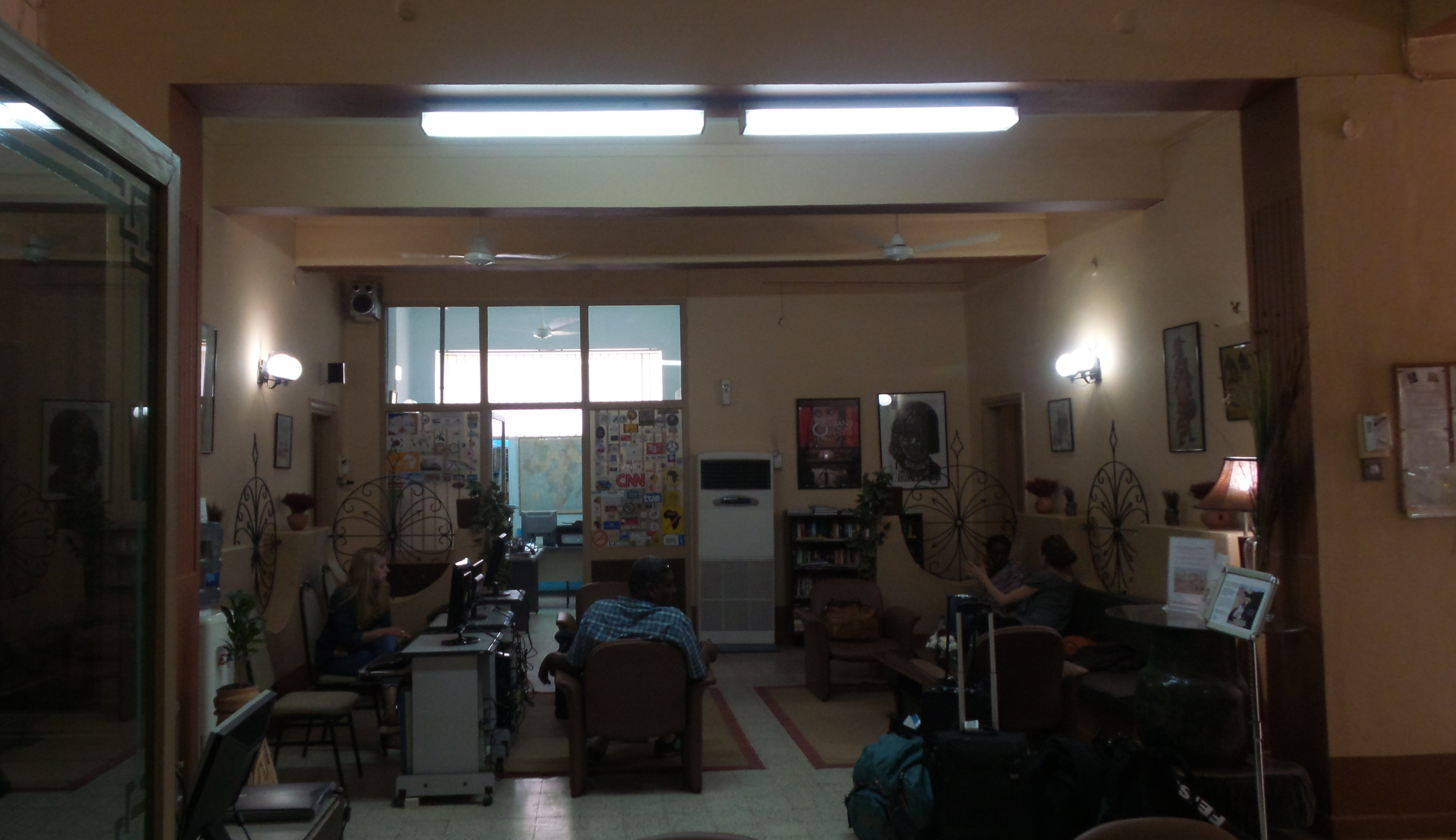
The lobby in 2016.

On 15 May 1988, a commando of the Abu Nidal Organization bombed the restaurant, killing a British couple with their two children, another Briton, and two Sudanese workers, leaving 21 people injured. Thanasis Pagoulatos lost part of his hearing in the blast.

Nevertheless, the three Pagoulatos brothers and their wives managed to restore the hotel just opposite the ruins of the old one in a building which was built in 1952 and designed by Greek architect C. N. Stefanides.

The Acropole has remained since then one of the most popular places for Western visitors, particularly journalists, archaeologists, humanitarians and other NGO workers. For this reason, the Acropole appears frequently in travel books. A 1995 piece in the Washington Post praised the 41-room establishment as

"a rare oasis of efficient telecommunications and the friendliest atmosphere between Cairo and Nairobi."

When German filmmaker Leni Riefenstahl's helicopter crashed in the Nuba Mountains in early 2000 when she was 97, the Pagoulatos brothers found her a Sudan Airways captain and plane to rescue her and the crew, and had an ambulance waiting at the airport.

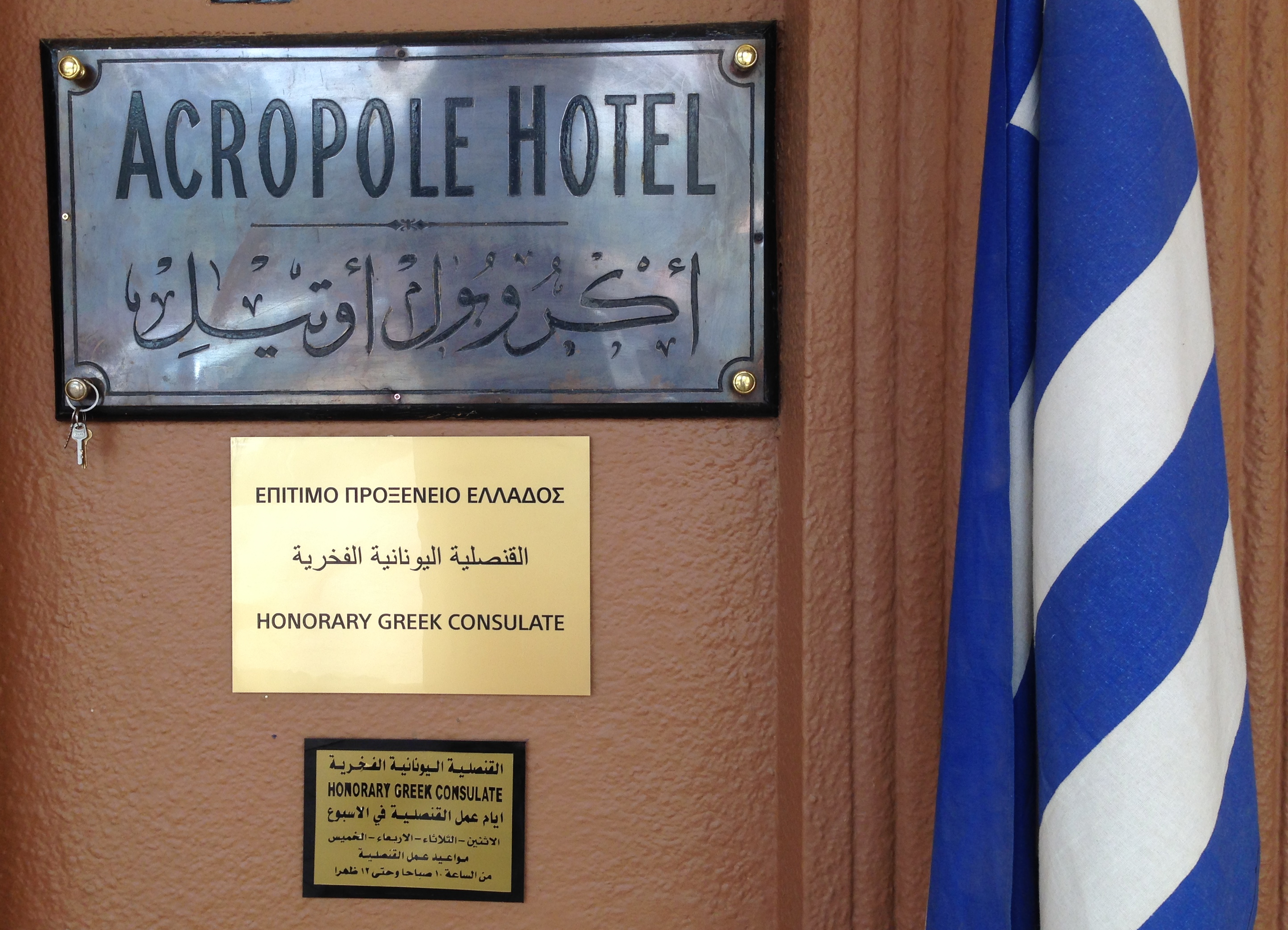
The Honorary Consulate of Greece at the Acropole

An added attraction is the OHM electronics shop next door, which is owned by the brother of Sheikh Musa Hilal, previously the leader of Darfur's notorious Janjaweed militia. Several journalists and members of human rights organizations managed to interview Hilal in that shop.

After the Greek embassy was closed in September 2015, Greece's new diplomatic representative as Honorary Consul became Gerasimos Pagoulatos, with the Honorary Consulate based at the Acropole Hotel.

At the 2016 Venice Biennale of Architecture, George Pagoulatos was featured in the presentation of Sir David Chipperfield's design for a museum at the UNESCO World Heritage Site of Naqa along with portrays of other people who are related to the archeological project, photographed by German photographer Heinrich Voelkel of the Berlin-based Ostkreuz photo agency. The caption of the image read:

“I have been getting up at 5:30 a.m. for the last 50 years. My wife looks after me very well, she is my right hand, my left hand – an inspiration to me. We both grew up in Sudan. She is of Italian origin and I belong to the Greek minority. We have been happily married for 43 years. Some of the archeologists have come to our hotel for over 20 years. Having solved various problems together, we have developed strong bonds that go well beyond business relationships. We are like a family."

The entry-way to the Acropole was covered by team photographs of people from many of the archaeological missions which the Pagoulatos-family assisted.

On 1 July 2022, George Pagoulatos, who directed "Acropole affairs with the courtesy and aplomb of the captain of a luxury liner", died at the age of 75 years. The Süddeutsche Zeitung, one of the leading daily newspapers in Germany, hailed him in an obituary as

"the best ambassador of Sudan"

When the Sudanese civil war began on 15 April 2023, the Acropole was at the epicentre of heavy fighting between the Sudanese Armed Forces (SAF) and the paramilitary Rapid Support Forces (RSF) for control over downtown Khartoum. The then 79-year-old Thanasis Pagoulatos and his sister-in-law Eleonora ("Nora"), the widow of George, were holed up in the hotel building with four guests and three staff with no electricity or running water, and food stocks running low after five days. RSF fighters ransacked the hotel, robbing guests and staff, who were only able to leave after ten days through streets littered with dead bodies.

Thanasis and Nora were finally evacuated by the French Armed Forces to Djibouti from where they went on to Athens. Thus, the Acropole closed its doors for the first time in 71 years. While some press reports called it the end of an era, Thanasis in a Reuters interview expressed firm hope for a return. One of the few items he managed to take with him was a handwritten note by Mother Teresa.
