= Hotel Pasaje, Havana =

Former hotel in Habana, Cuba

Hotel Pasaje
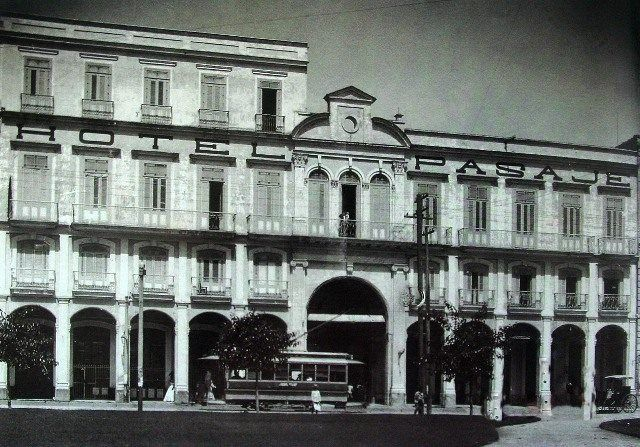
- Interactive map of the Hotel Pasaje area

General information
- Type: Commercial
- Architectural style: Neo classic
- Location: Havana, Cuba
- Coordinates: 23.135962°N 82.358382°W
- Completed: 1876
- Demolished: 1980s
- Owner: Zequeria y Zequeria family

Technical details
- Floor count: 3
- Lifts/elevators: 1

The Hotel Pasaje was a hotel located on Paseo del Prado between San José and Dragones, facing the National Capitol in Havana, Cuba.

== History ==
Before the Havana walls were torn down, a partial map shows the site of the Villanueva railway (later the site of the National Capitol), and the site of the Pasaje hotel before the plots were subdivided.

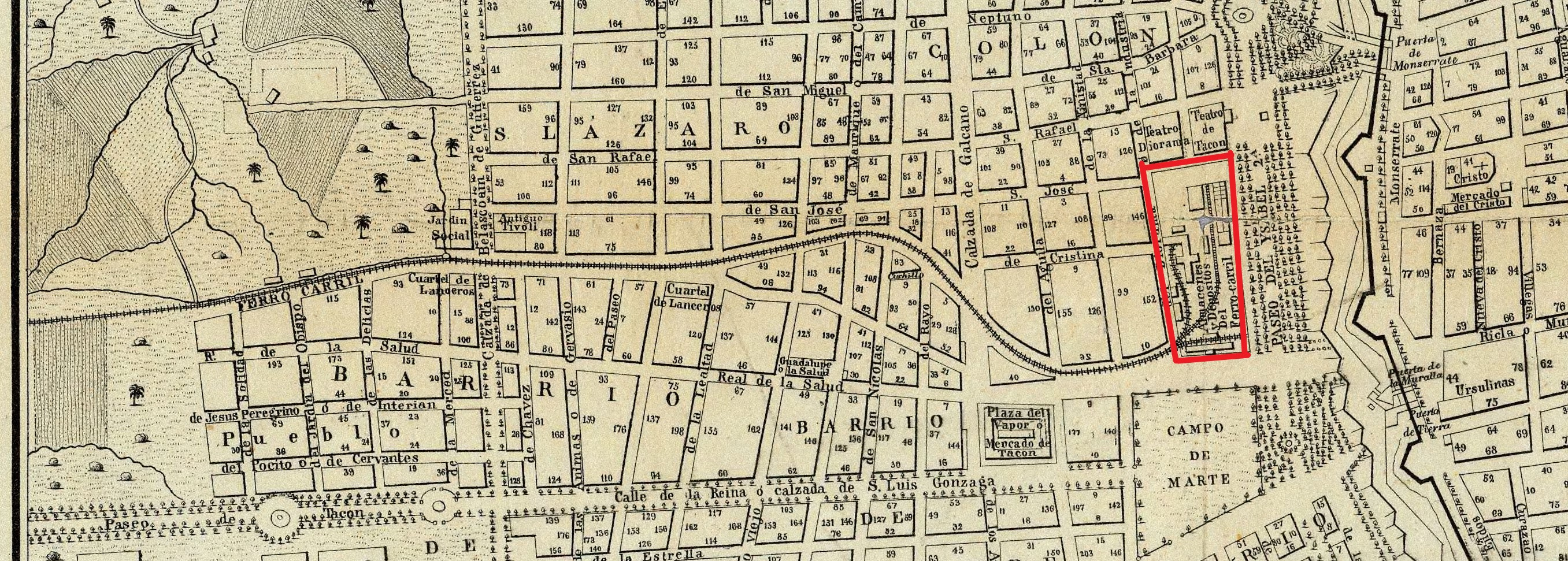
Partial map of Havana showing the Villanueva railway station and the Paseo de Isabel before the Capitol and Hotel Pasaje were built.

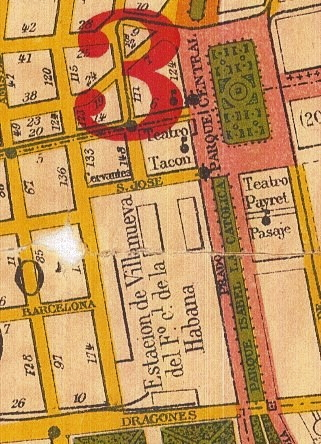
Fragmento-del-Plano-de-La-Habana-de-1900-de-Esteban-Pichardo, Havana, Cuba

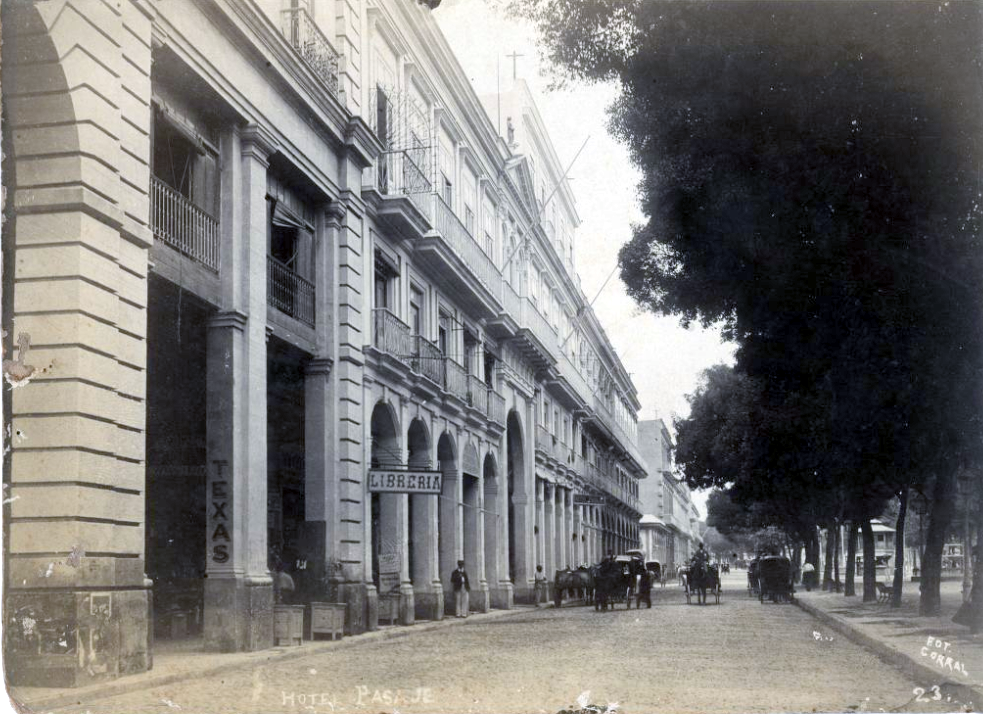
Hotel Pasaje in front of Paseo de Isabel

Built in 1871, the Hotel Passage was the first building to be built in Cuba dedicated to the hotel industry.

== Gallery ==
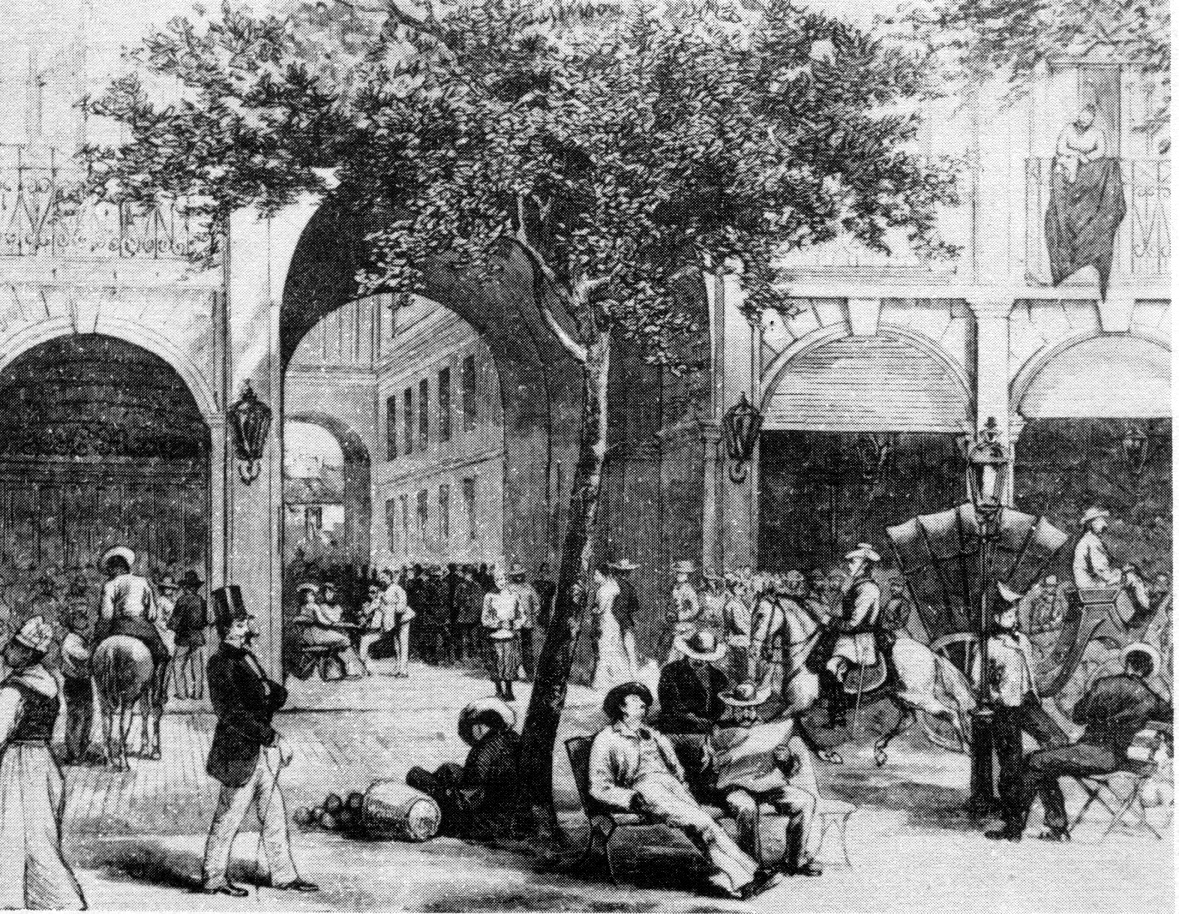
Galería-hotel-Pasaje-siglo-XIX, Havana, Cuba

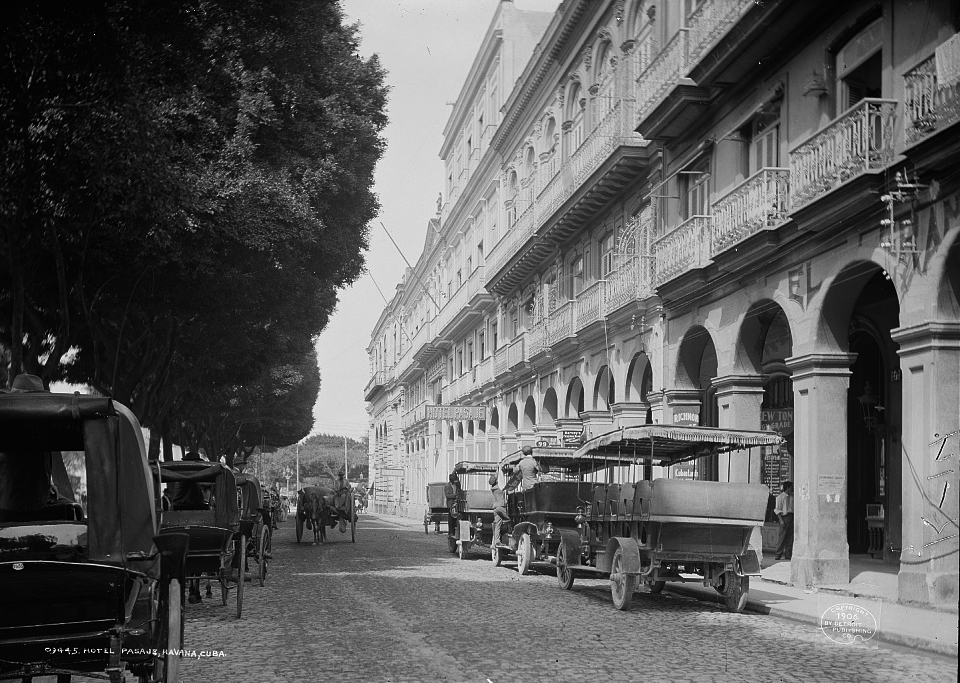
Hotel Pasaje, Havana, Cuba

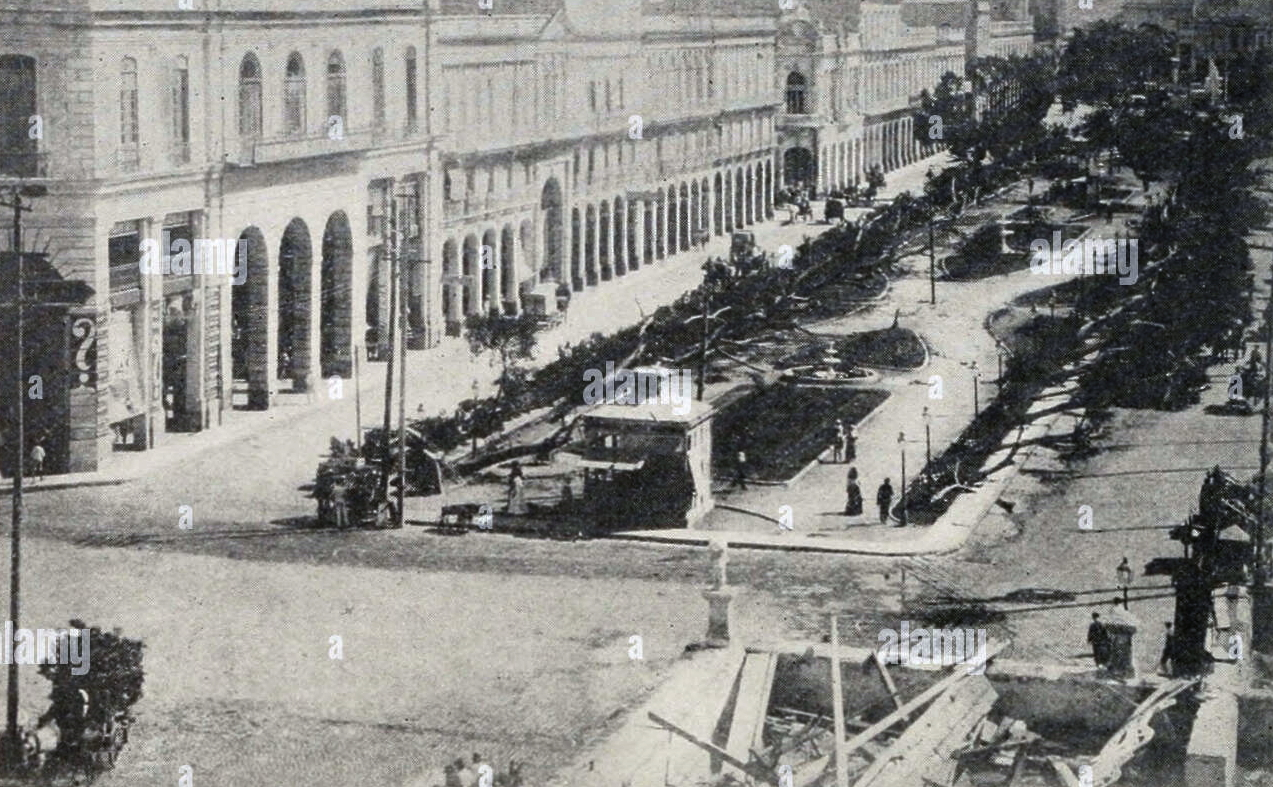
Hotel Pasaje on Paseo de Isabel, Havana, Cuba

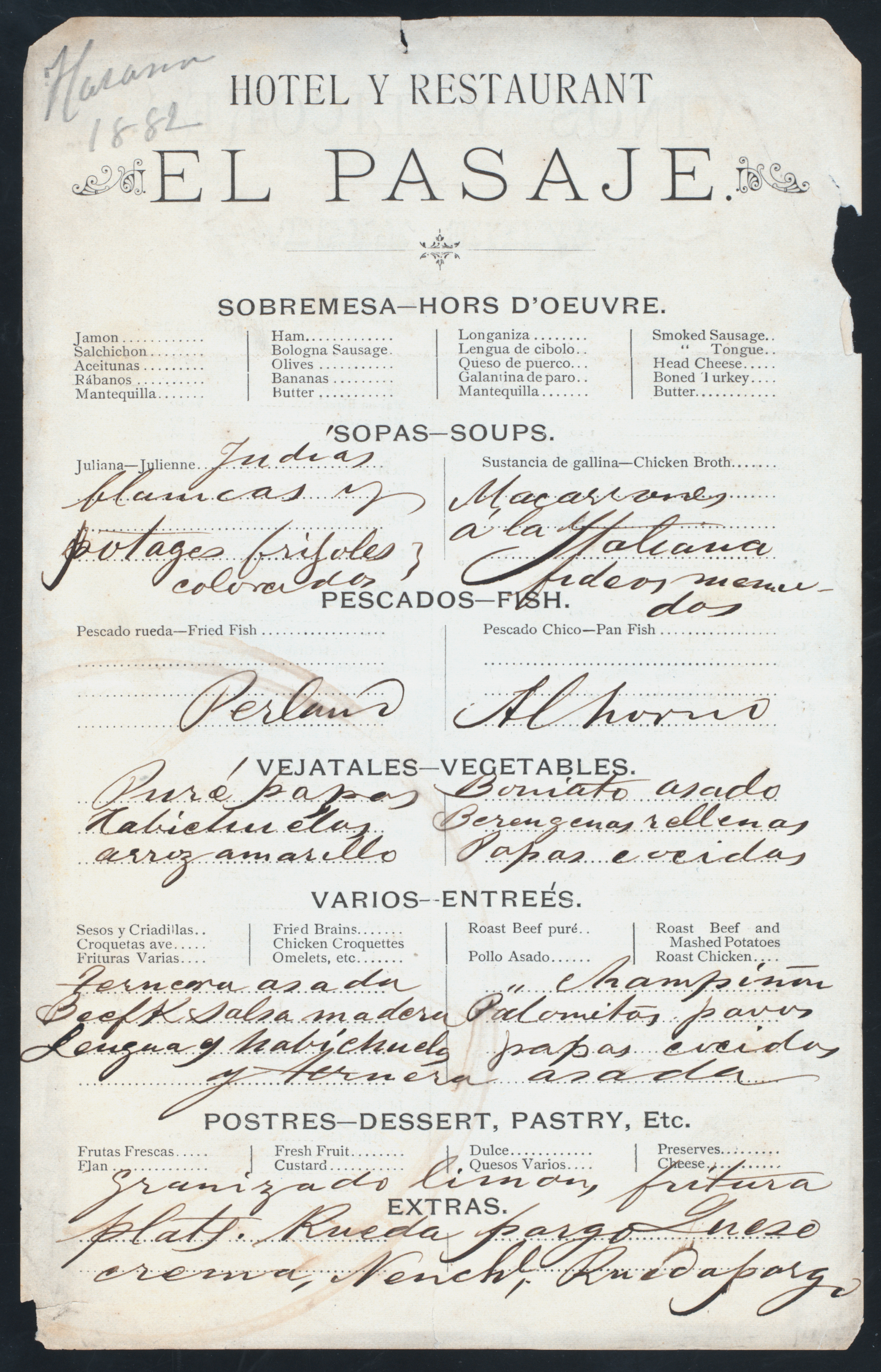
DAILY DINNER MENU, EL PASAJE HOTEL

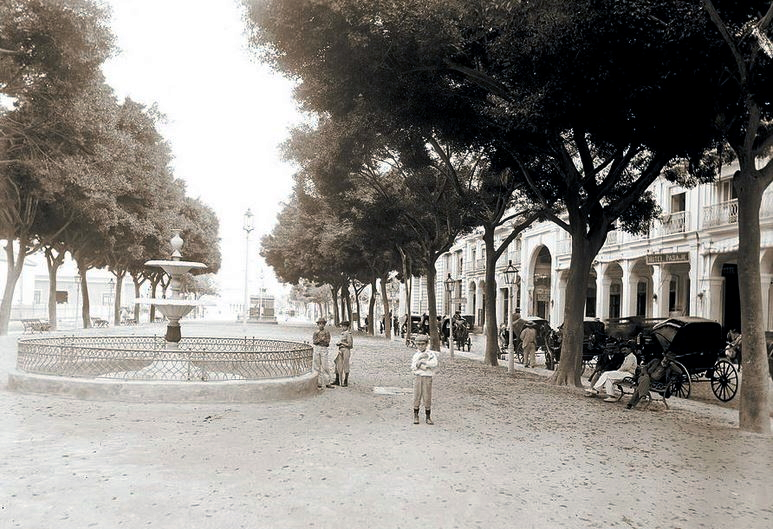
Paseo Isabel and Hotel Pasaje, Havana, Cuba.

== See also ==
- Hotel San Carlos, Havana
- Hotel Saratoga, Havana
- Royal Palm Hotel (Havana)
- Hotel Perla de Cuba, Havana
- Palacio de la Marquesa de Villalba, Havana
- El Capitolio
