= Hotel Saratoga explosion =

2022 explosion in Havana, Cuba

- Date: 6 May 2022
- Venue: Hotel Saratoga
- Location: Havana, La Habana, Cuba; 23°08′01″N 82°21′29″W
- Cause: Gas leak
- Deaths: 47
- Injuries: 52

On 6 May 2022, Hotel Saratoga, a luxury hotel in the Old Havana municipality in the city of Havana, Cuba, suffered a suspected gas explosion that damaged large portions of the building as well as surrounding infrastructure. 47 people died and 52 were injured. The hotel was undergoing renovations and there were no guests; however, there were fifty-one workers inside.

== Background ==
The historic five-star Hotel Saratoga is located at the intersection of Paseo del Prado and Dragones in the Cuban capital, in front of the Fuente de la India. The building that became the hotel was initially three-stories and built with a tobacco warehouse on the ground floor, apartments on the second, and hotel rooms on the third floor in 1880. The building was commissioned by wealthy Spanish merchant Eugenio Palacios in 1879 and was first located at Monte Street. The central location of the building made it a favorite among international visitors, and in 1933 the building was remodeled as a hotel and moved to its current location.

In the 1960s, following the Cuban Revolution, the hotel was nationalized by the new communist government and later became a low-class housing facility, before being closed due to its deplorable conditions.

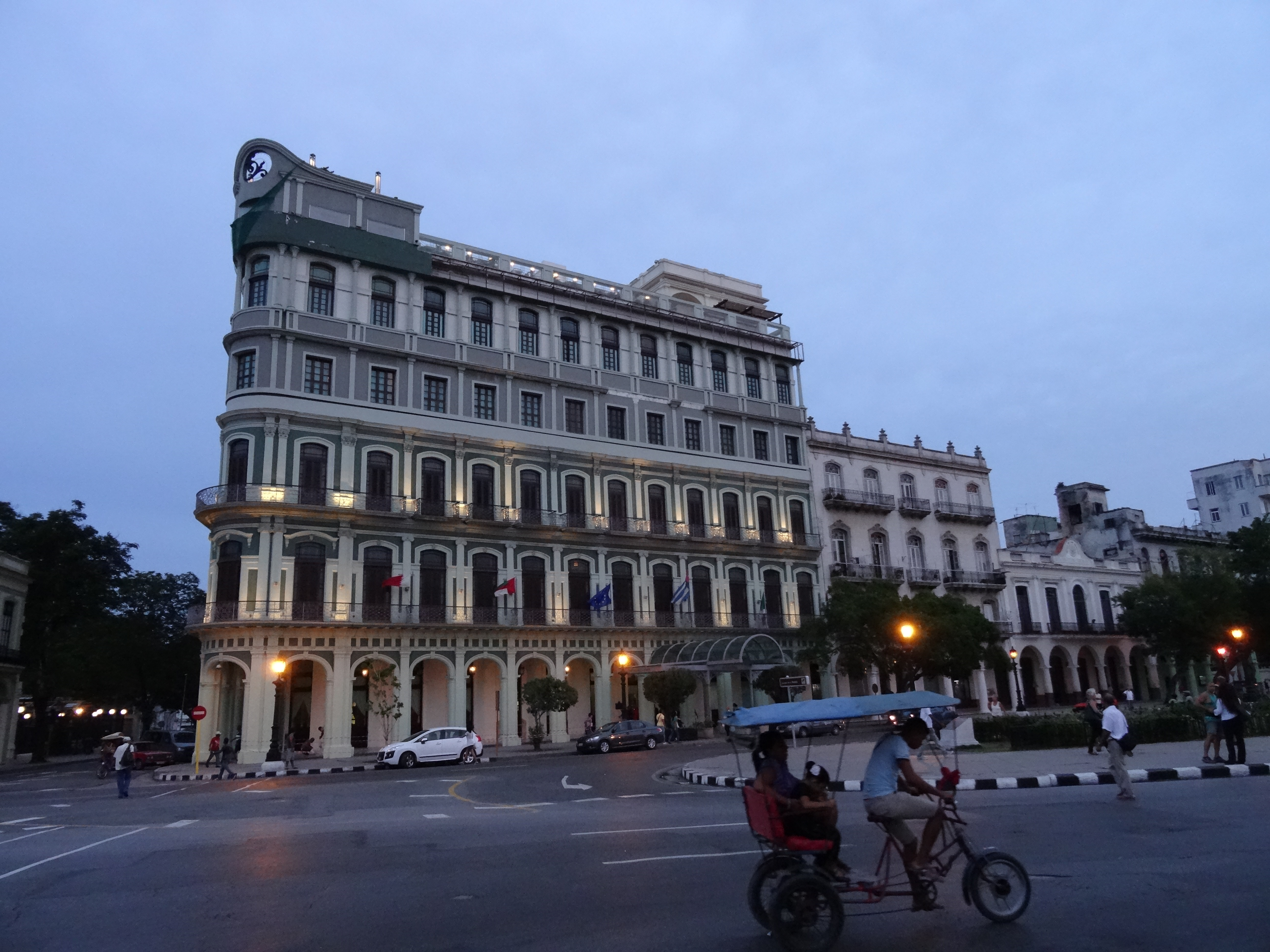
Hotel Saratoga in 2014

In 1996, the building was transferred to a newly created joint venture company Hotel Saratoga S.A., co-owned by Habaguanex S.A., the commercial arm of the City Historian's Office, and an international confederation of investors. Part of the original building was then demolished, leaving only the façade on the three street fronts. The building was reconstructed with seven floors and two basement levels and was reopened in 2005.

The hotel often hosted prominent international politicians and celebrities, but the country's vital tourism sector had been struggling due to the COVID-19 pandemic's effect on both national and international travel. At the time, the building was undergoing renovations and populated entirely by workers, fifty-one of whom were inside at the time. The hotel was set to reopen on 10 May 2022.

== Explosion ==
External videos
- USA Today clip of the damaged hotel on YouTube
- Infobae video moments after the explosion on YouTube

The hotel was struck by a suspected gas explosion from a gas leak. The explosion destroyed entire sections of the building and damaged nearby buildings such as El Capitolio, Teatro Martí, and the Calvary Baptist Church. The façade of the building was almost entirely destroyed, and parts of it collapsed onto the street, crushing cars and people as well as sending debris flying through the air. As not all of the building was destroyed, remaining rooms could be seen damaged from the street.

== Casualties ==
99 people were reported as injured, of which 52 were discharged and 47 had died. All but one of the dead were Cuban citizens, while the other was a Spanish tourist. Among the dead were four teenagers, a pregnant woman and a child. On 10 May it was reported that twenty-three of the 51 people who were working at the hotel at the time were killed, and three workers remained missing. The bodies of all the missing people were later recovered.

== Aftermath ==
Emergency personnel from Cuba and organizations like the Red Cross worked to excavate the site, locate survivors, and recover bodies. First Secretary of the Communist Party of Cuba Miguel Díaz-Canel visited the site on the same day as the explosion and visited survivors at Hermanos Ameijeiras Hospital, where some blast victims were taken for treatment. Messages of support came from such figures as Marcelo Ebrard, the Mexican minister of foreign affairs, and Queen Elizabeth II of the United Kingdom.

The First Secretary of the Communist Party said that 38 homes had been affected and that the neighboring building would be demolished.

On 13 May 2022, Cuban authorities concluded their search and rescue and all operations on the scene. First Secretary Díaz-Canel announced an official period of mourning from 06.00 on 13 May to 12.00 at night on 14 May.
