= Hotel Saratoga =

Hotel in Havana, Cuba

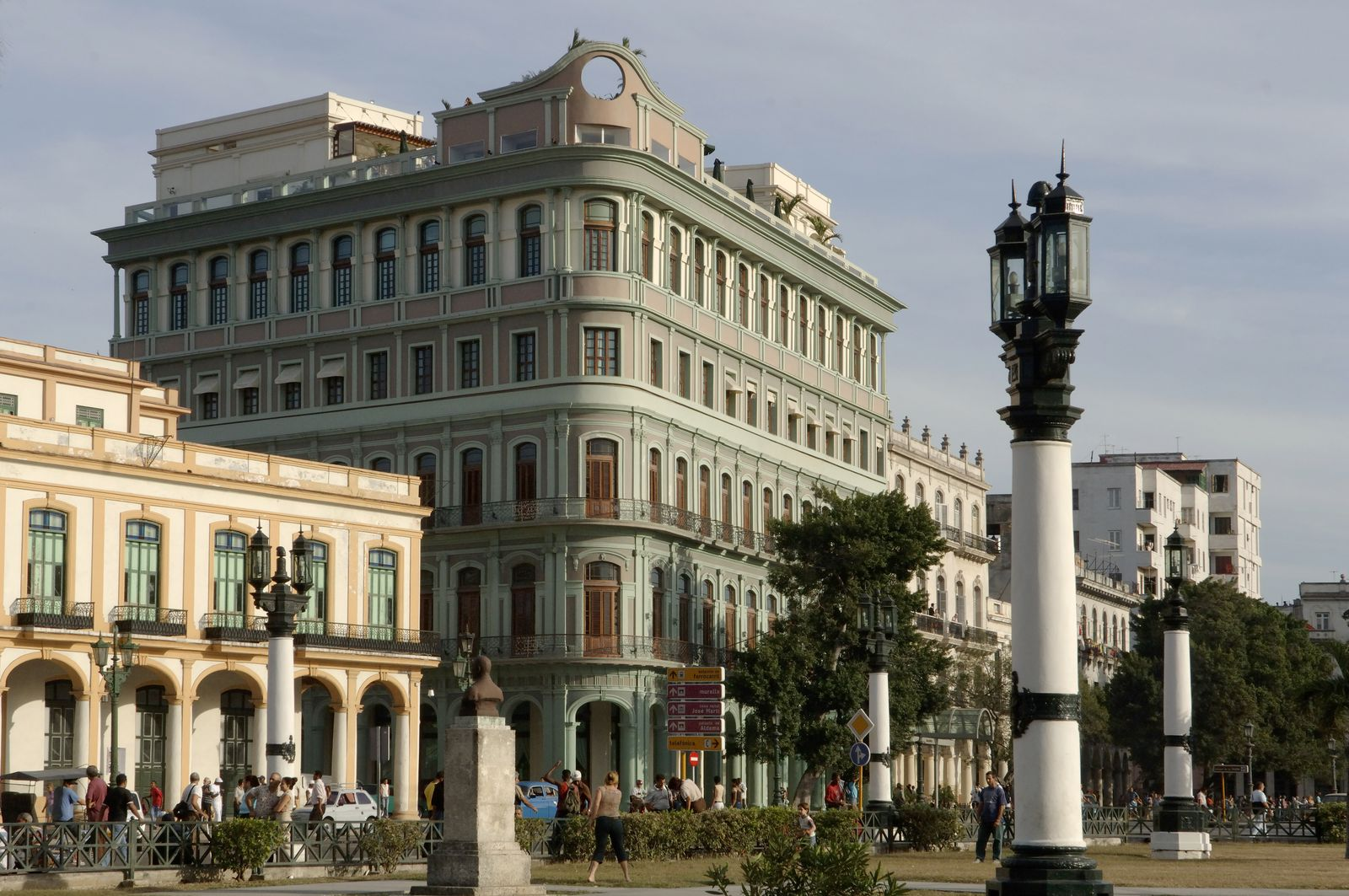
- Hotel Saratoga, before the 2022 explosion that largely destroyed it
- Interactive map of the Hotel Saratoga area
- Former names: Hotel Alcazar

General information
- Status: Closed
- Type: Commercial
- Architectural style: Postmodern
- Location: Paseo del Prado No. 603, Havana, Cuba
- Coordinates: 23°08′01″N 82°21′29″W
- Completed: 1888
- Opened: 2005
- Renovated: 1933
- Closed: April 2020
- Owner: Revolutionary government
- Landlord: Empresa Mixta Hotel Saratoga S.A.

Height
- Architectural: 33 meters (108 ft)
- Roof: 27 meters (89 ft)
- Top floor: 24 meters (79 ft)

Technical details
- Structural system: Reinforced concrete
- Floor count: 13
- Lifts/elevators: 4
- Grounds: 1,132 square metres (12,180 sq ft)

Website
- www.hotel-saratoga.com

The Hotel Saratoga was a historic hotel located on the Paseo del Prado, in Old Havana near the Fuente de la India. Built in 1880 as a warehouse, it was remodeled into a hotel in 1933. It was further remodeled in 2005 and reopened as a luxury hotel. The hotel was largely destroyed by a gas explosion on 6 May 2022, which killed forty-seven people.

== History ==
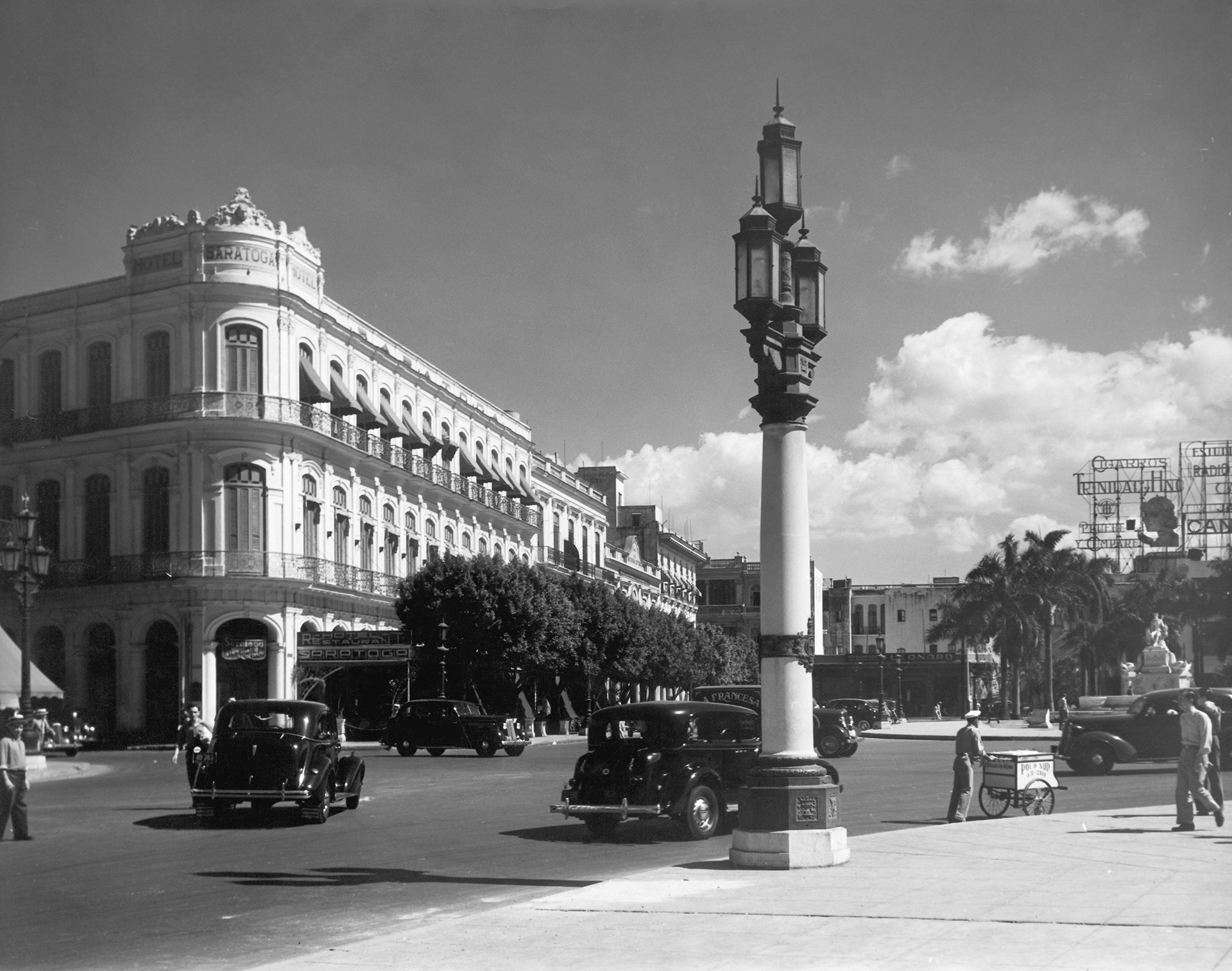
Hotel Saratoga, ca. 1945.

The Hotel Saratoga is located in front of the Parque de la Fraternidad near the Capitolio Building in Havana, Cuba. Spanish merchant Gregorio Palacio y Pérez commissioned the building. Originally, it was a three-story building.

Its first location was on Calle Monte. Later it was moved to the surroundings of the Campo de Marte (now the Parque de la Fraternidad) and called the Alcázar.

The central location and the views made it a preferred destination for international visitors. In 1935, tourist guides highlighted the hotel as one of the best in Havana. Its terrace, called Aires Libres, was an important cultural and traditional center in the 20th century.

== Revolutionary period ==
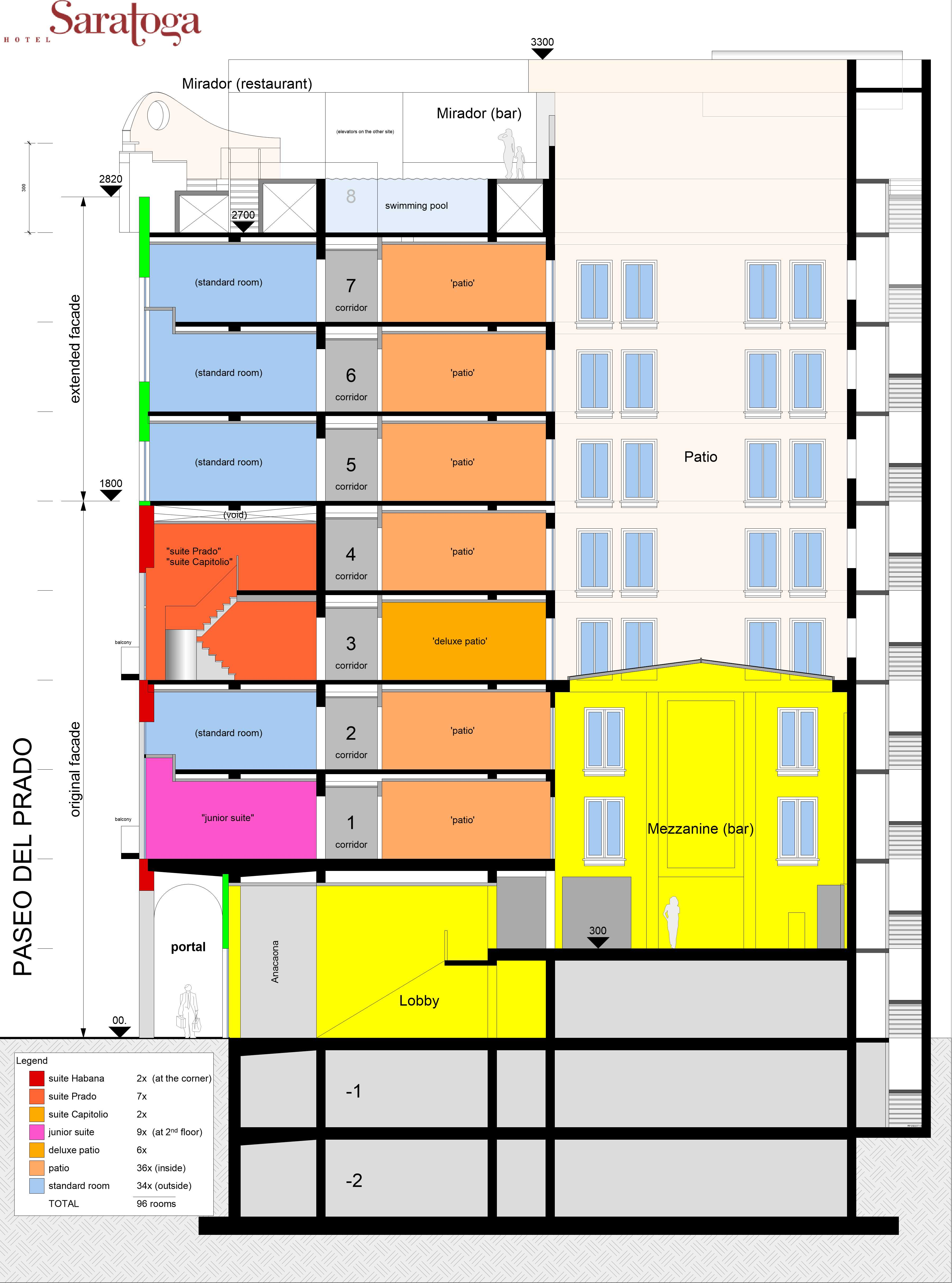
Hotel Saratoga Hotel cross section

Like most businesses in Cuba in the 1960s, the Hotel Saratoga was confiscated by the revolutionary government. (Note: " Confiscation: (a) The nationalization, expropriation, or other seizure by the Cuban Government of ownership or control of property on or after 1 January 1959 without the return or compensation for the property, or without settlement of the claim to the property pursuant to an international claims settlement agreement or other mutually accepted settlement procedure; or (b) The Cuban Government's repudiation of, default on, or failure to pay on or after 1 January 1959 the following: (i) a debt of any enterprise nationalized, expropriated, or otherwise taken by the Cuban Government, (ii) a debt that is a charge on property nationalized, expropriated, or otherwise taken by the Cuban government, or (iii) a debt which was incurred by the Cuban Government in satisfaction or settlement of a confiscated property claim. See LIBERTAD Act § 4 (4).") Until then, the building had maintained its vitality. After the takeover by the revolutionary government, it became a tenement building with multiple subdivisions until it was vacated due to its poor condition. (Note: Also see 104th Congress Public Law 114:) In 1996, the property was transferred to Hotel Saratoga S.A., a Cuban joint-venture company owned jointly by Habaguanex S.A., the commercial arm of the City Historian's Office, and an international consortium of investors. The original building was gutted, and only the street façades on Paseo del Prado and Dragones remained. A new building was constructed behind the original façades, including a two-level basement, a mezzanine level, and additional floors. It was reopened in 2005 as a five-star hotel with 96 rooms, three bars, two restaurants, a rooftop swimming pool, and a business center. Its architecture recalled the colonial era and had an eclectic character with a large number of elements of interest such as French carpentry, ceramics, and Cuban marble. The two original facades were destroyed by the explosion.

== 2022 explosion ==
An explosion occurred on 6 May 2022 at the hotel, killing forty-seven people, including one Spanish tourist. The hotel's facade was sheared off and the interior was gutted. The cause was attributed to an accident while resupplying the building with gas.

== Gallery ==
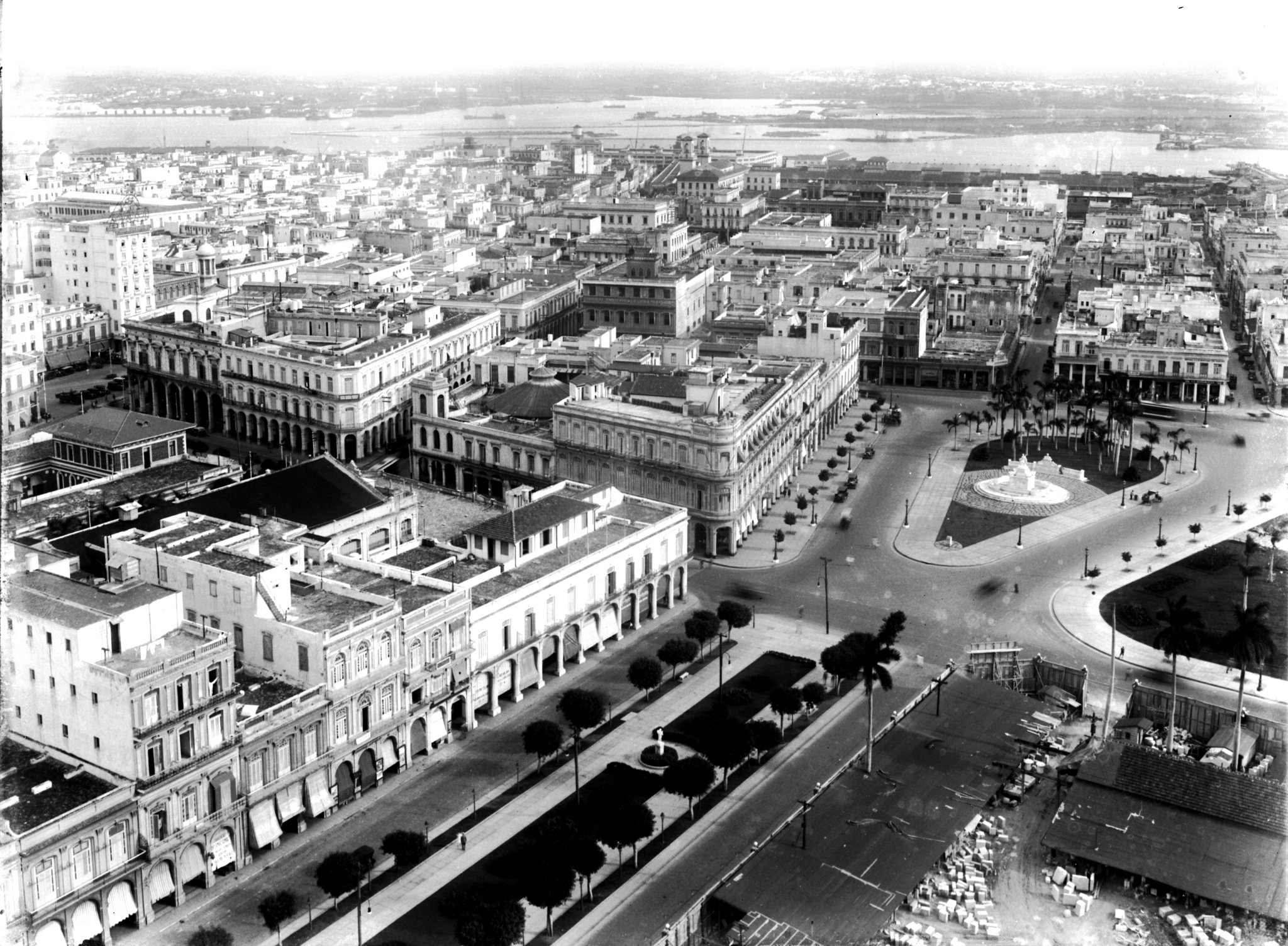
Aerial view. circa 1929

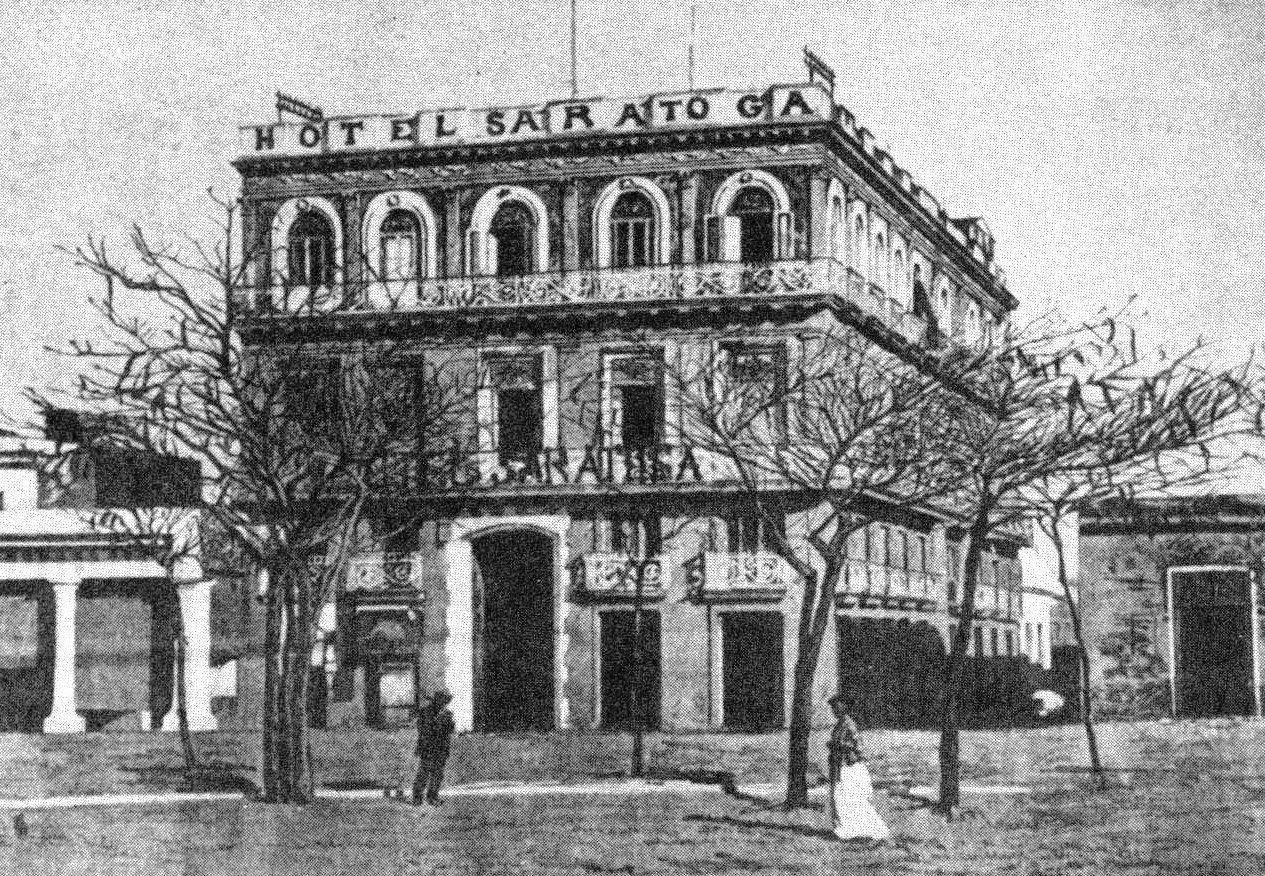
First Hotel Saratoga, Calle Monte

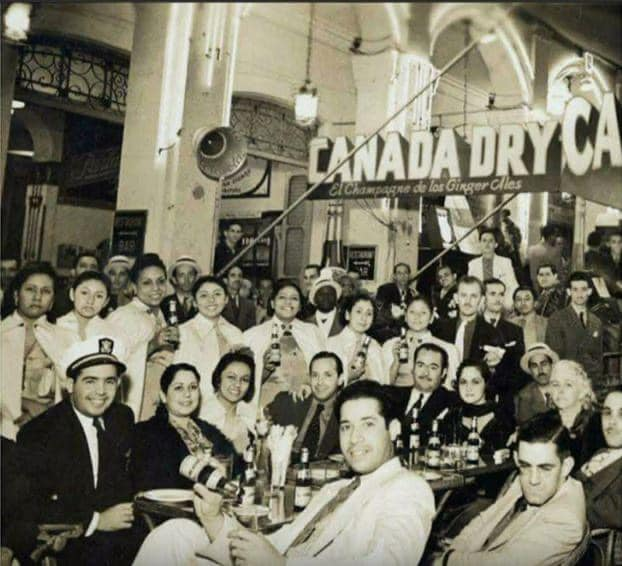
1950s

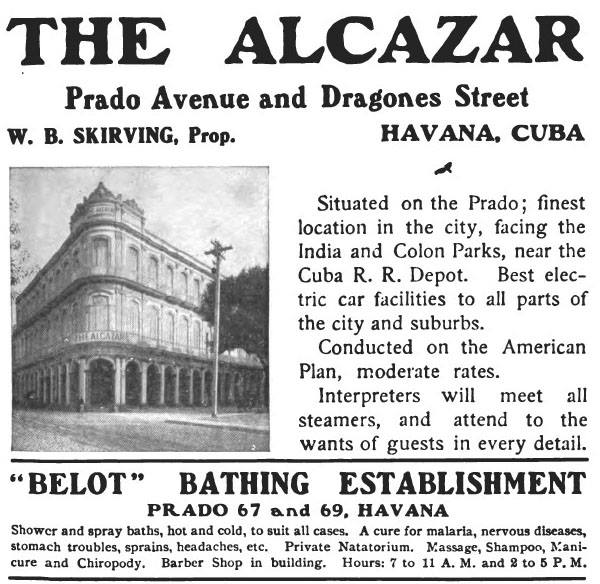
The original Hotel Alcazar

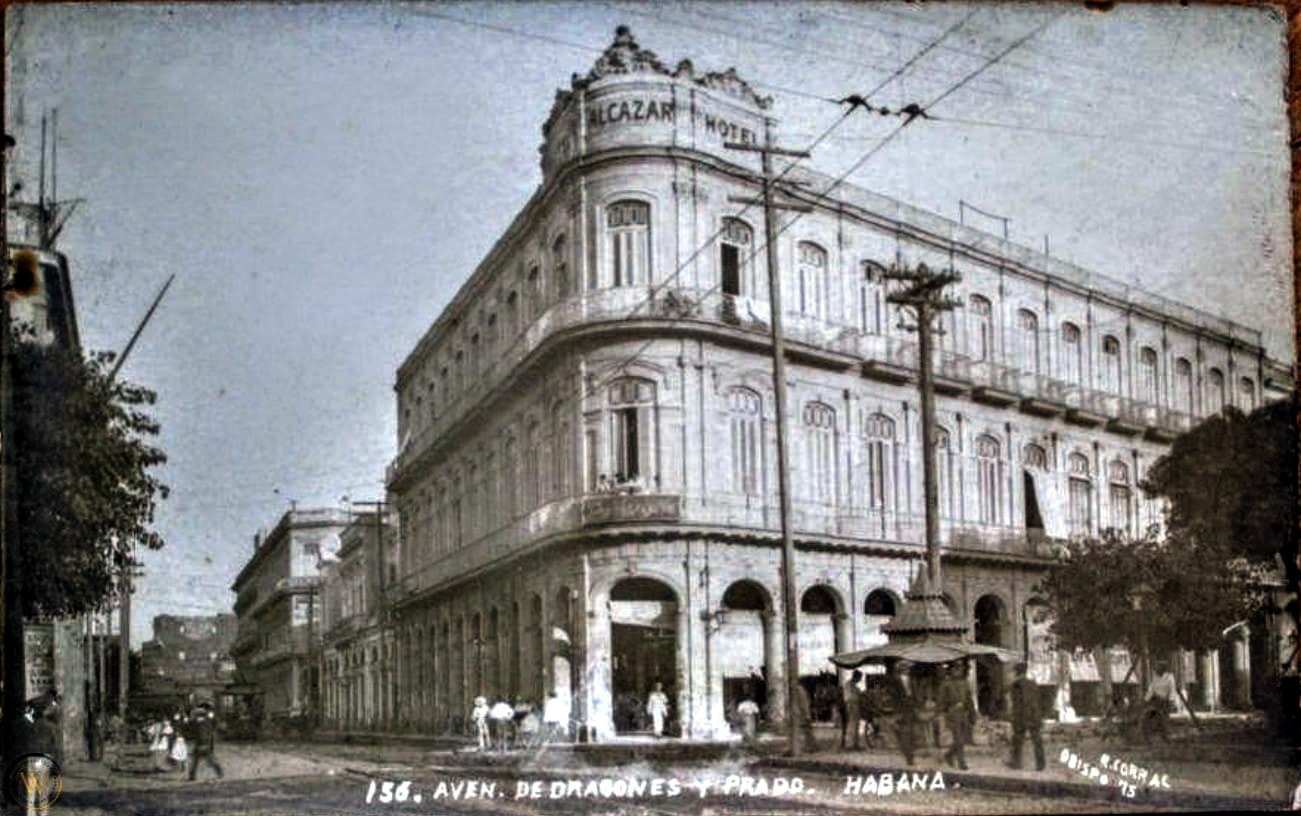
Hotel Alcazar, 1910

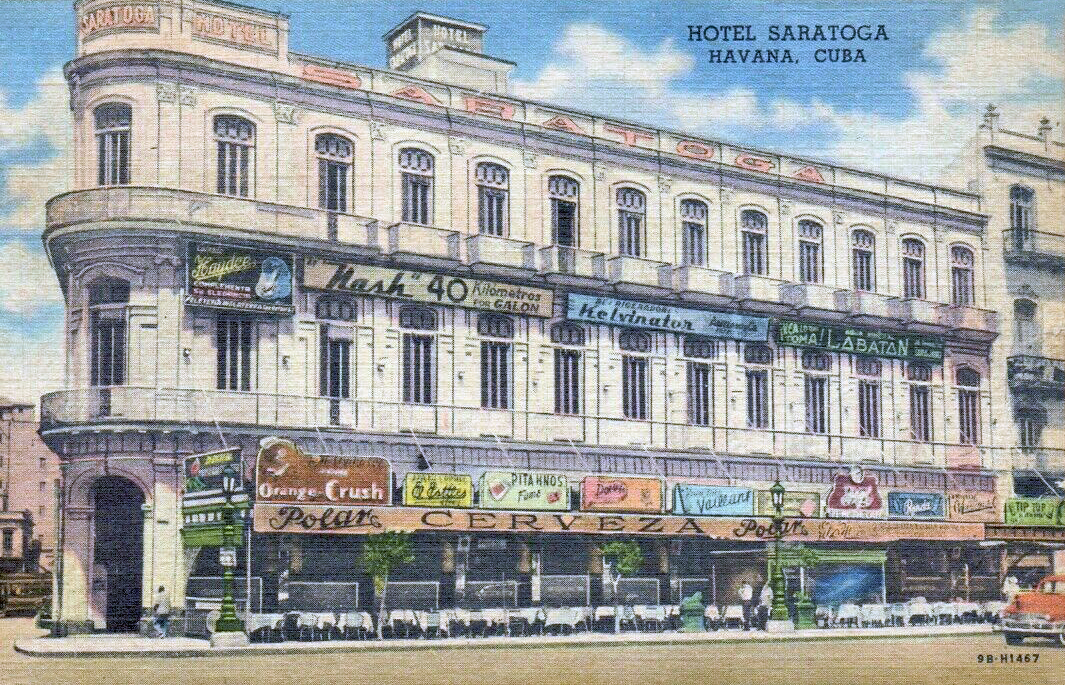
Hotel Saratoga in 1949

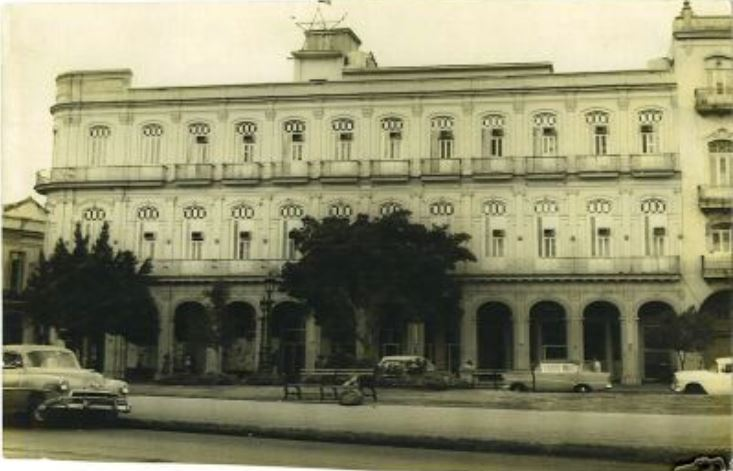
Hotel Saratoga, Havana, Cuba

== See also ==
- Gran Hotel Manzana Kempinski La Habana
- Royal Palm Hotel (Havana)
- Hotel Perla de Cuba, Havana
- Fuente de la India
- Paseo del Prado, Havana
