= George Pagoulatos =

Greek-Sudanese hotel manager (1946–2022)

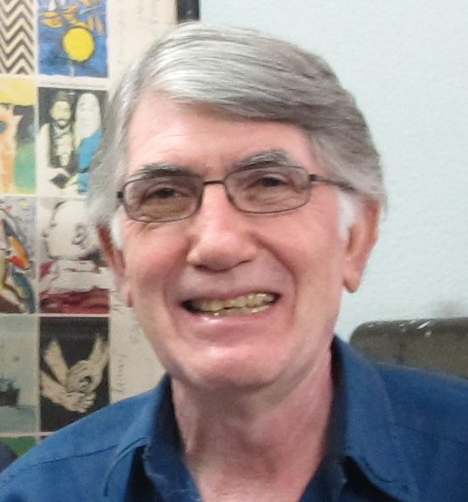
- Pagoulatos in the management office of the Acropole in 2016

George Pagoulatos (Greek: Γεώργιος Παγουλάτος; 1 August 1946 - 1 July 2022) was a Greek-Sudanese hotelier. With his wife, brothers and other family members he ran the legendary Acropole Hotel in the Sudanese capital Khartoum for almost half a century. Pagoulatos was widely considered as "one of the most influential Greeks of Sudan".

== Life ==
=== Family background ===
Pagoulatos was born in Khartoum. His father Panagiotis ("Panaghis") Pagoulatos hailed from the village of Valsamata on the Ionian island of Cephalonia and left war-torn Greece in 1944. His mother Flora was an Egypt Greek from Alexandria.

=== Career ===
At the 2016 Venice Biennale of Architecture, George Pagoulatos was featured in the presentation of Sir David Chipperfield's design for a museum at the UNESCO World Heritage Site of Naqa along with portrays of other people who are related to the archeological project, photographed by German photographer Heinrich Voelkel of the Berlin-based Ostkreuz photo agency. The caption of the image read:

“I have been getting up at 5:30 a.m. for the last 50 years. My wife looks after me very well, she is my right hand, my left hand – an inspiration to me. We both grew up in Sudan. She is of Italian origin and I belong to the Greek minority. We have been happily married for 43 years. Some of the archeologists have come to our hotel for over 20 years. Having solved various problems together, we have developed strong bonds that go well beyond business relationships. We are like a family."
