= 1988 Khartoum attacks =

1988 terrorist attack

- Location: Khartoum, Sudan
- Date: 15 May 1988
- Attack type: Shooting, grenade attacks
- Deaths: 7
- Injuries: 21
- Perpetrator: Abu Nidal Organization

On 15 May 1988, Abu Nidal Organization terrorists carried out machine gun and grenade attacks against two sites frequented by Westerners in Khartoum, Sudan. Seven people were killed and 21 people were wounded in the attacks.

== Attacks ==
On 15 May 1988, terrorists from the Abu Nidal Organization attacked two sites in Khartoum, Sudan, using machine guns and hand grenades: the Acropole Hotel, which hosted a large number of foreigners and diplomats, and the Sudan Club, used exclusively by British and Commonwealth citizens. Witnesses and the police said an explosion tore through the dining room of the Acropole as guests were having dinner and ripped two large holes in the ceiling and the floor of the one-story building, scattering severed limbs across the floor. One of the two children killed in the hotel was decapitated. A total of 7 people were killed and 21 wounded in the two attacks.

The attacks came 30 minutes before a national unity government was sworn in at the presidential palace a few hundred yards away. According to the Economist Intelligence Unit, the attacks on the soft targets, which were well known for hosting many Westerners, were "in apparent revenge for the Israeli assassination in Tunisia of the PLO military leader Khalil al-Wazir."

In October 1988, five terrorists belonging to a front group of the Abu Nidal Organization were sentenced to death for the attacks. Their death sentences were commuted to prison time when the relatives of the Sudanese victims agreed to the payment of "blood money." In January 1991, shortly before the Gulf War started, the new regime of the Islamist leader Hassan Al Turabi released the five from prison.
