= Fuente de la India =

Fountain in Havana, Cuba

Coordinates: 23°7′59.78″N 82°21′30.1″W

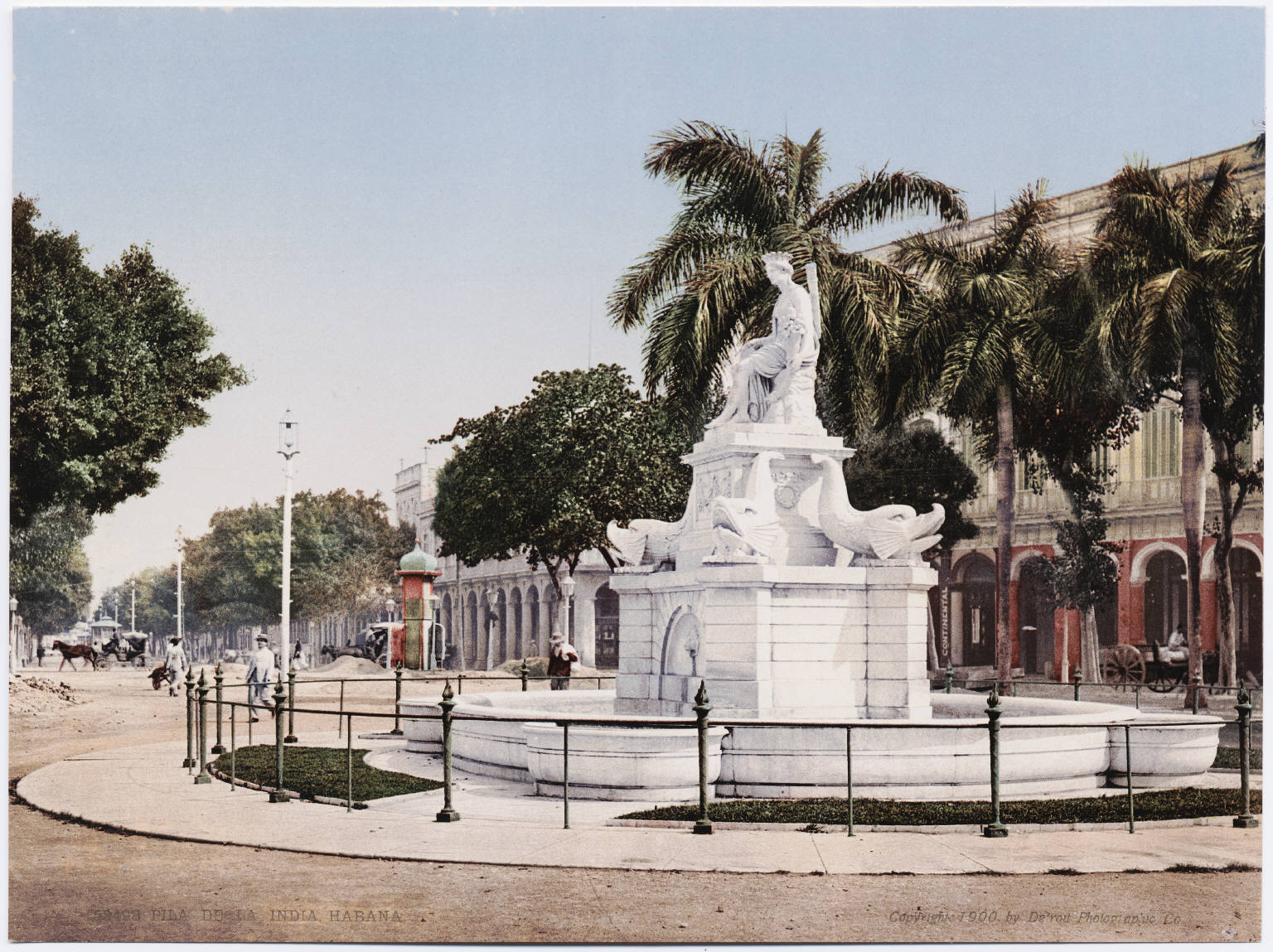
- Postcard of the fountain, circa 1900
- Artist: Giuseppe Gaggini
- Year: 1837 inauguration
- Medium: Carrara marble
- Subject: Indigenous allegory of Havana
- Dimensions: 300 cm × 600 cm (120 in × 240 in)
- Condition: Not working
- Location: Havana

Fuente de la India ("Fountain of the Indian woman") is a fountain by Giuseppe Gaggini in Havana, Cuba, at the south extreme of Paseo del Prado, about 100 m south of El Capitolio, between Monte and Dragones Streets. The figure represents the Indian woman "Habana" in whose honor Havana was named.

Originally (1837) it was placed outside the city walls at the end of the Alameda which today is the Paseo del Prado. From 1803 until that time a statue of King Carlos III was located there. Its opening was an event in the then still young town of San Cristobal. In 1863, by the resolution of Council, the fountain was moved to the Parque Central. In 1875 it was put back in its current position, i.e. its initial one but facing towards the then called Campo de Marte. In 1928, when the adjacent area became the Plaza de la Fraternidad, the statue was rotated 90° to face the new Capitolio building.

== History ==
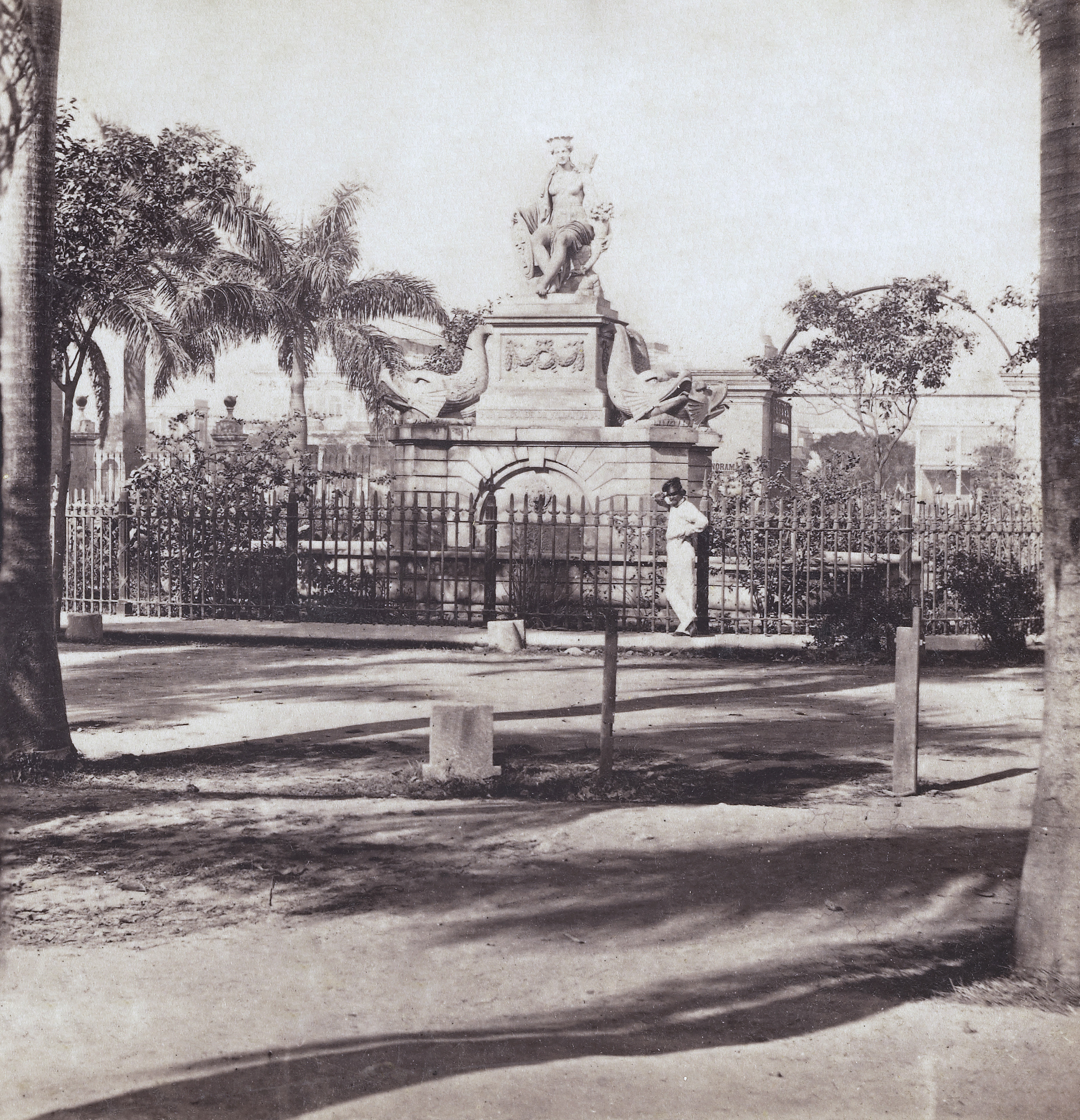
The fountain in 1860.

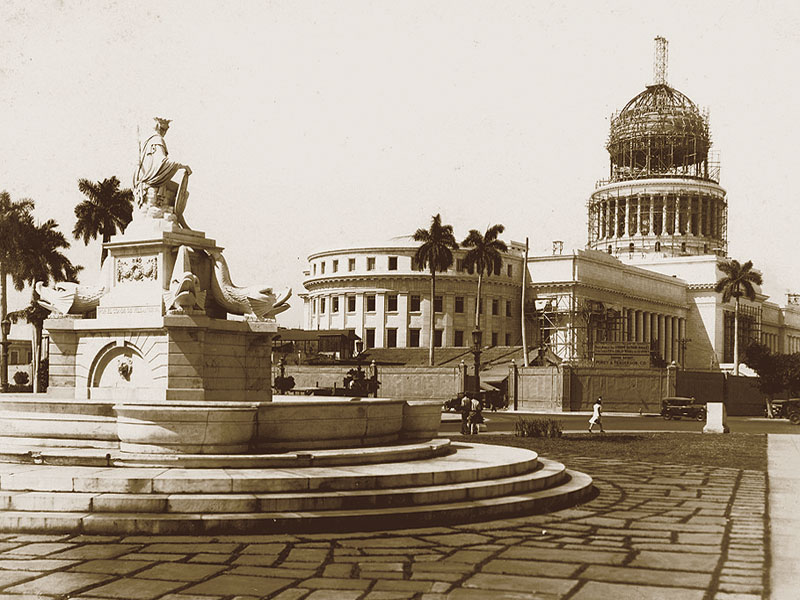
The fountain, with the Capitolio under construction. ca 1929.

The fountain, was built at the initiative of the Count of Villanueva Don Claudio Martinez de Pinillos. It was brought from Italy in 1837, and was modeled in Carrara by Italian sculptor Giuseppe Gaggini. About 3m high, India is a fountain of white marble on a rectangular pedestal with four dolphins, one on each corner, whose tongues are dispensers that pour water on the huge shells that form its base.

On a rock sits the young Indian woman looking to the east as if searching for some long-lost thing on the horizon. Her face is that of an Indian, but, and this is one of the strongest criticisms towards its creator, the statue shows a typical profile of a Greek woman, which, for its time, was the epitome of female perfection. She wears a crown of feathers over her left shoulder and a quiver full of arrows is fastened to her left shoulder, while with her right hand she holds the upper end of an oval shield, which bears the original symbols of the city. In her left hand she carries the cornucopia of Amalthea, but the Italian artist replaced European fruits with Cuban ones, and it is topped with a pineapple. Her image is highlighted by a pedestal adorned with laurels and garlands, which four large dolphins support.

The fountain is presently sited facing due north so that the face of the Havana sculpture is always in shadow.

== Gallery ==
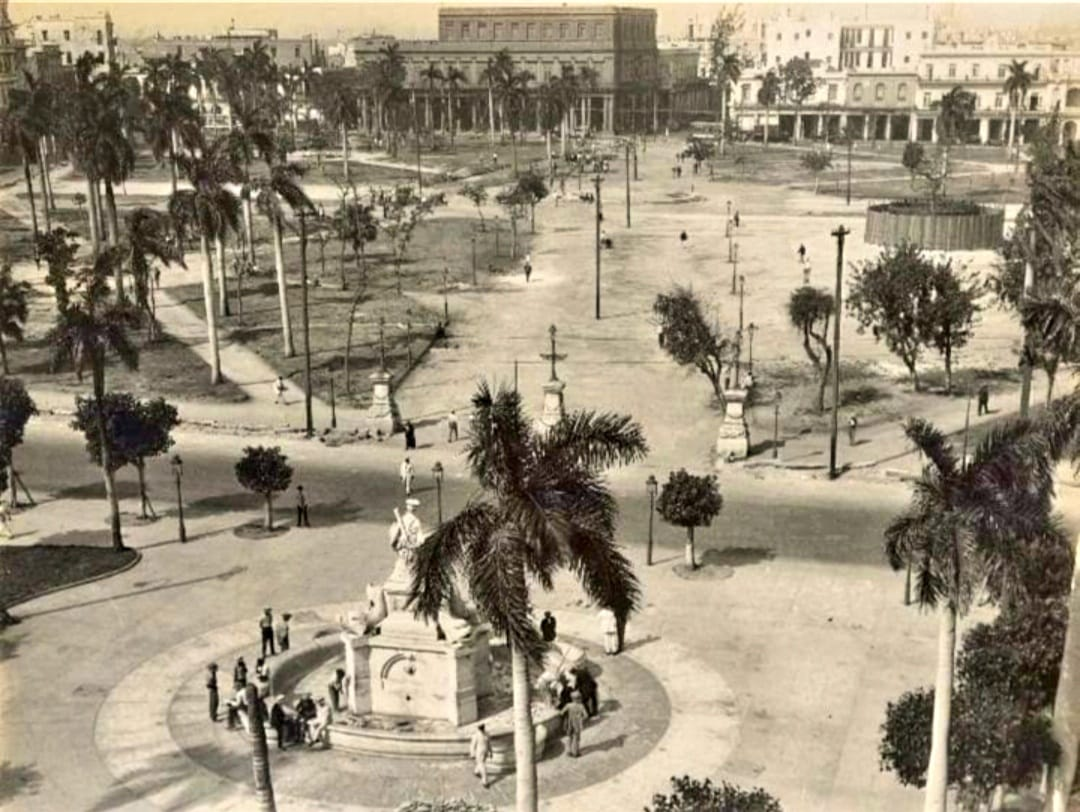
The fountain showing the Palacio de Aldama from the Campo Marte. Havana, Cuba

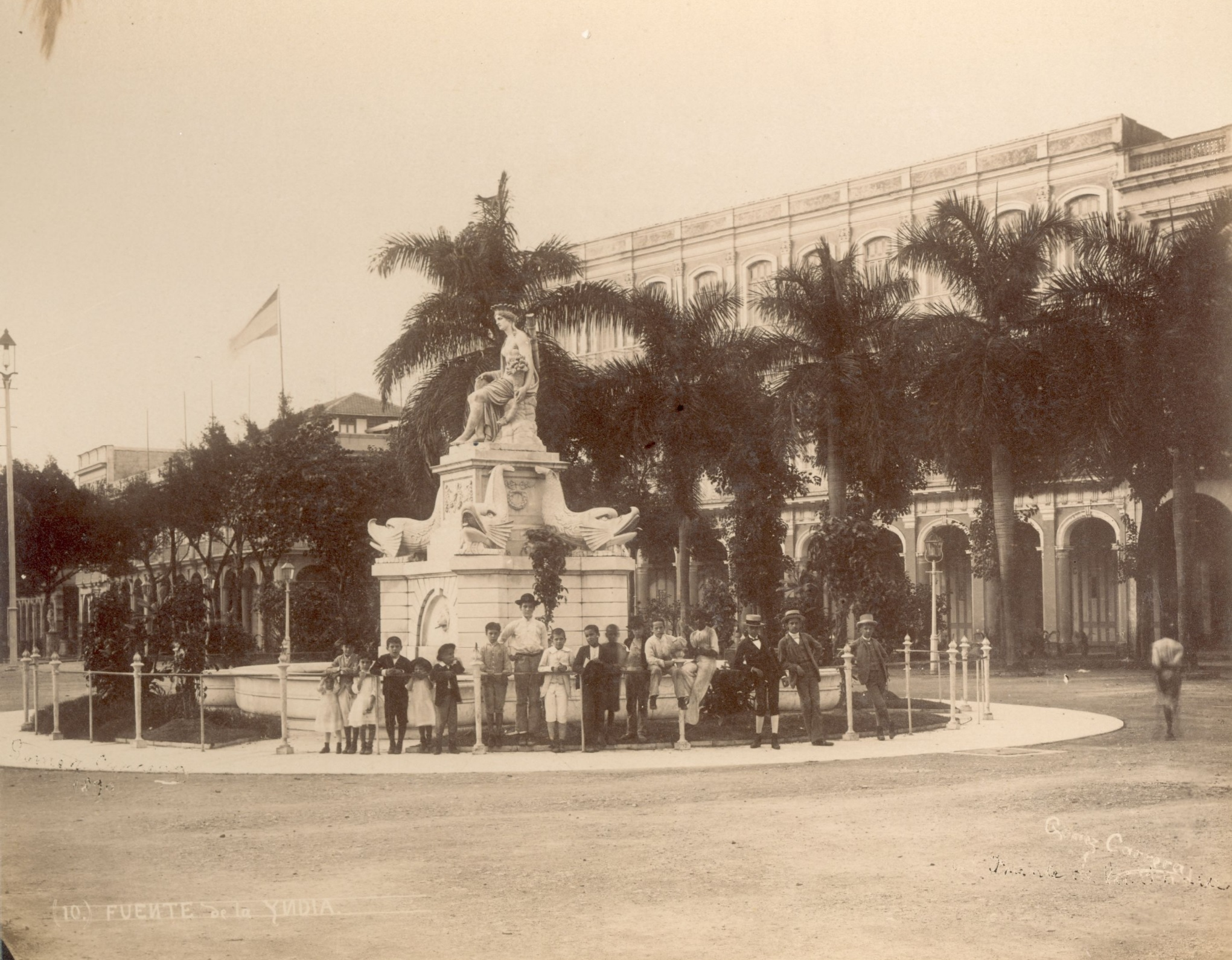
The fountain facing west with the later hotel Saratoga in the background (1895).

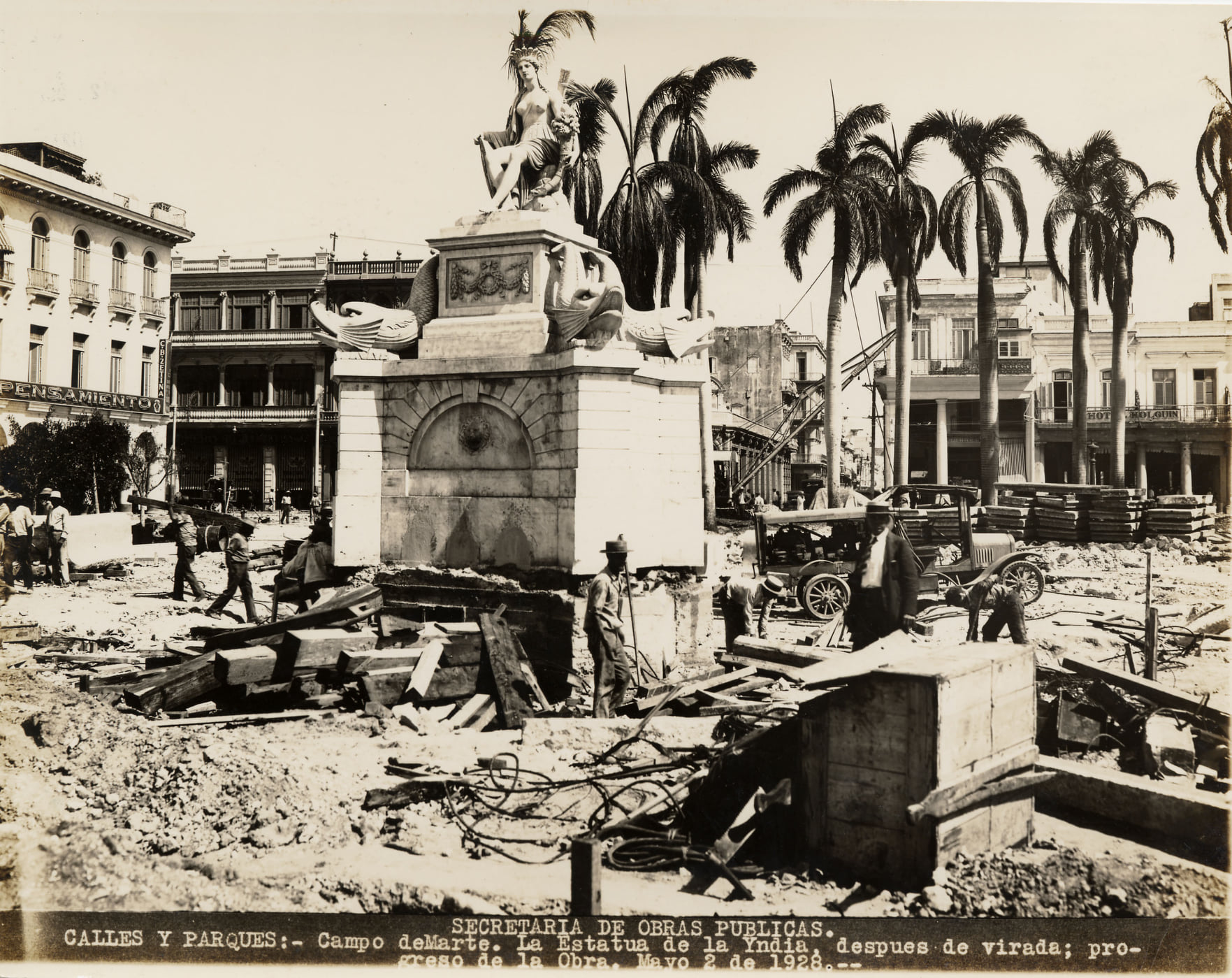
The elevation and rotation of the statue in 1928.
