= Hotel Perla de Cuba, Havana =

Hotel in Havana, Cuba

Hotel Perla de Cuba
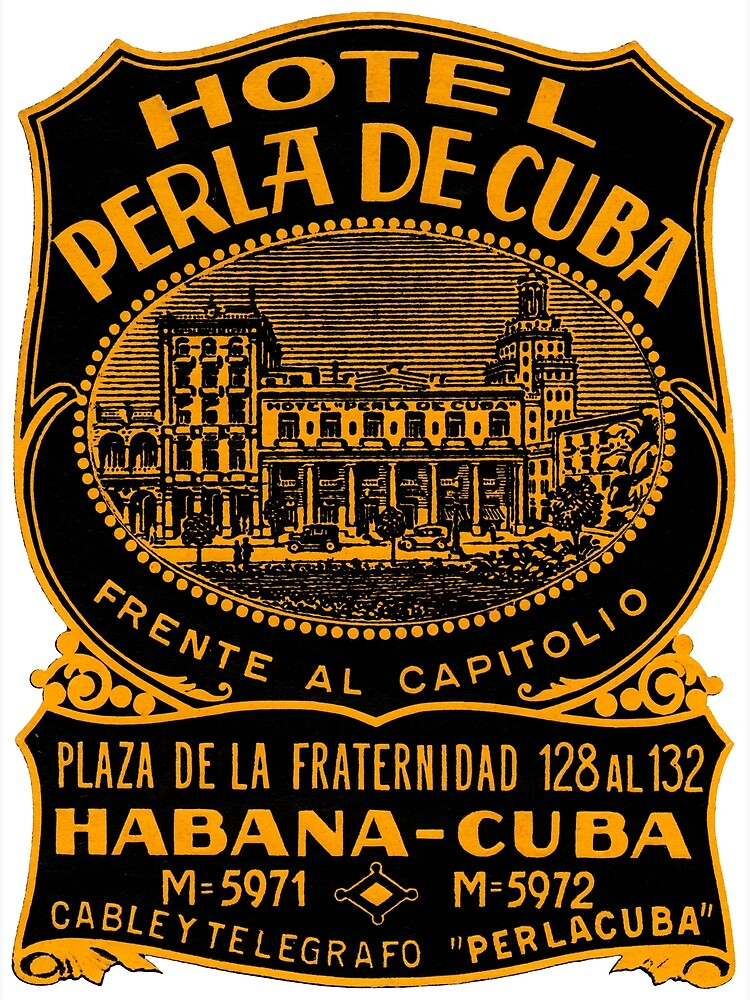

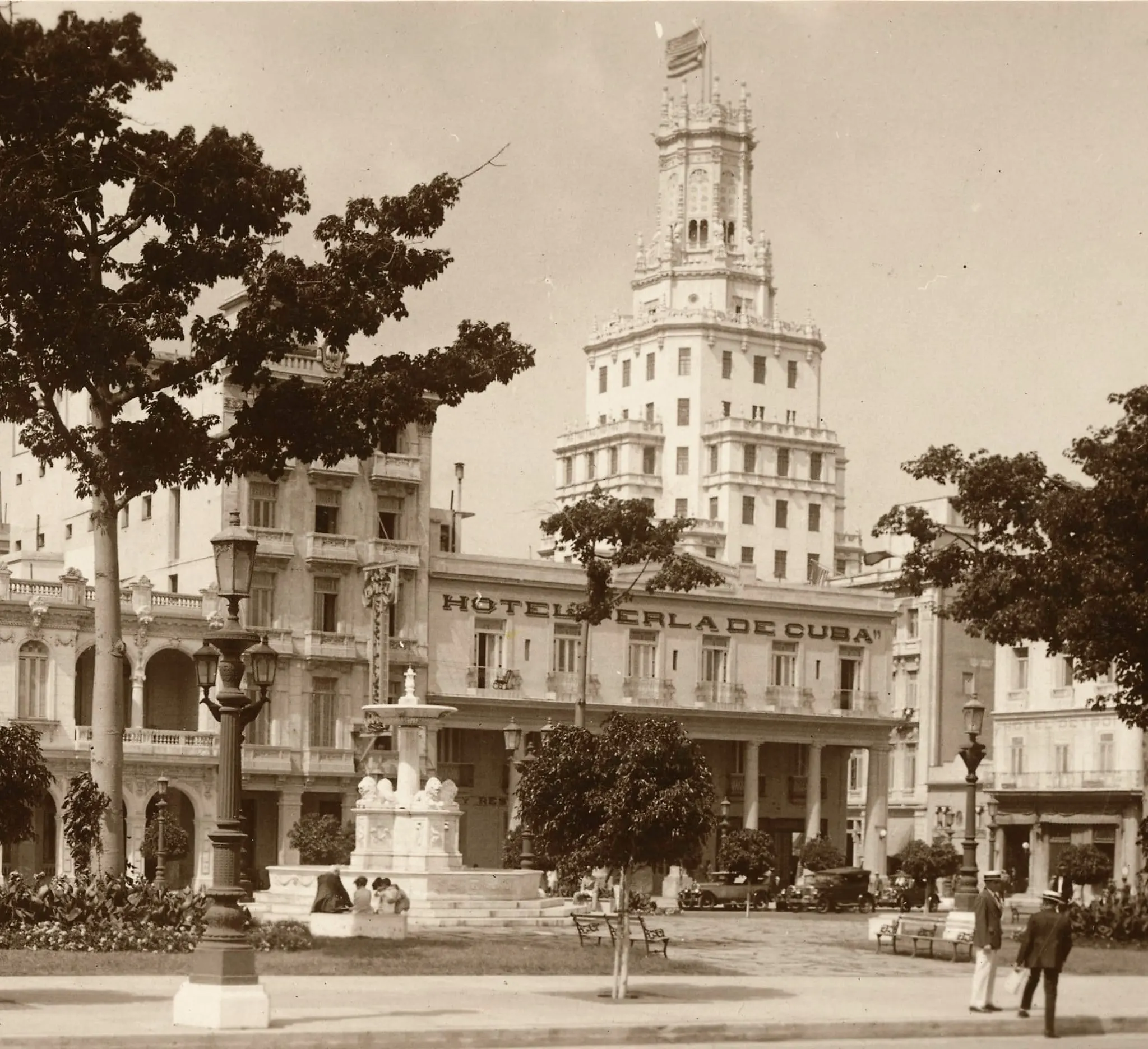
- Interactive map of the Hotel Perla de Cuba area

General information
- Status: Partially destroyed
- Type: Commercial
- Architectural style: Neo classical
- Location: Havana, Cuba
- Coordinates: 23.133442°N 82.36095823°W
- Owner: Revolutionary government (contested) (Note: This appropriation of private property led the U.S. into severing diplomatic relations in 1961 and installing the trade embargo and various sanctions against Cuba.)

Technical details
- Floor count: 5
- Lifts/elevators: 1

The Hotel Perla de Cuba in Havana was the first commercial hotel in Cuba, it was situated on the corner of Dragones and Amistad in the municipality of Centro Habana.

== Gallery ==
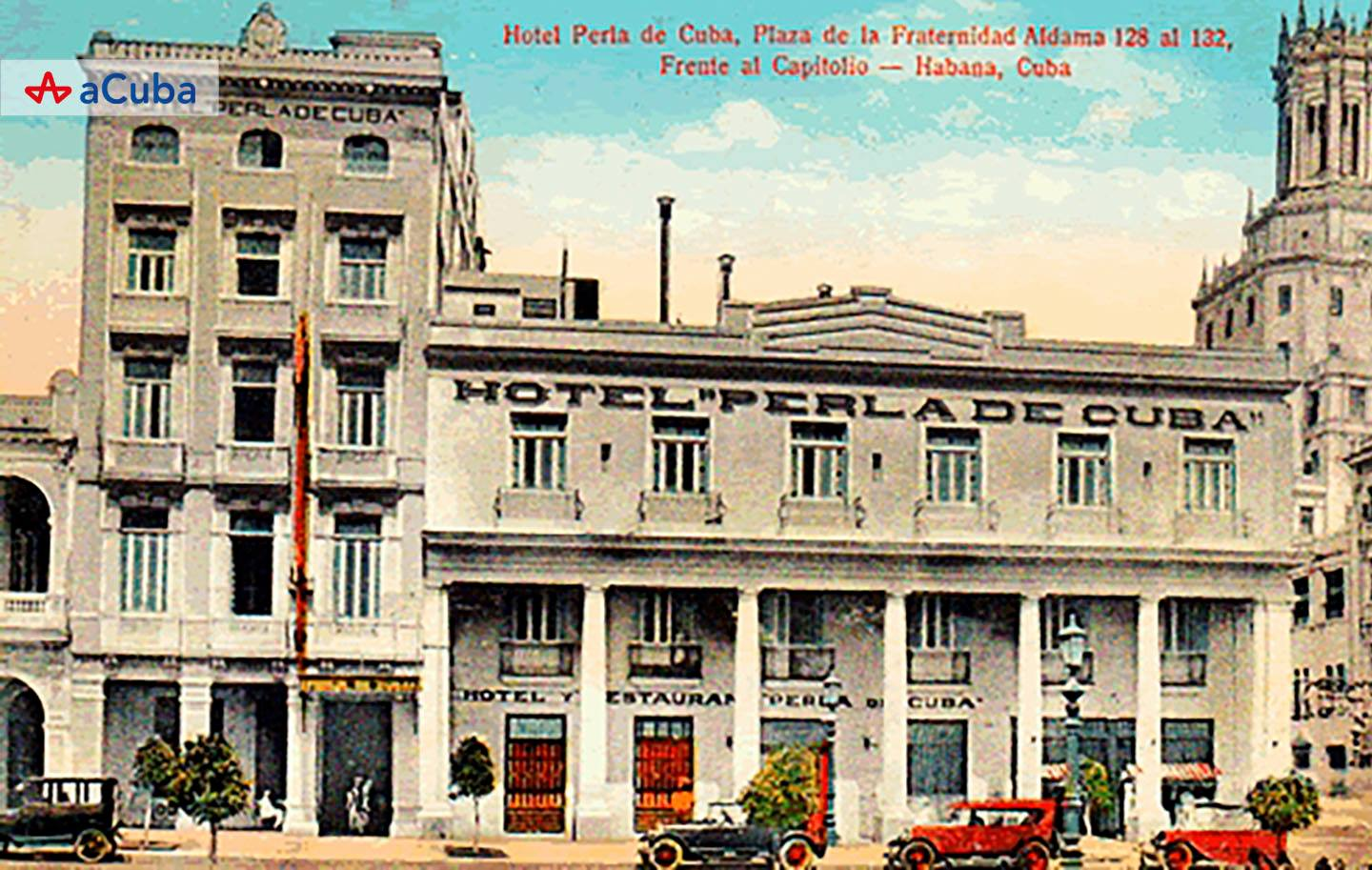
Hotel Perla de Cuba, Havana

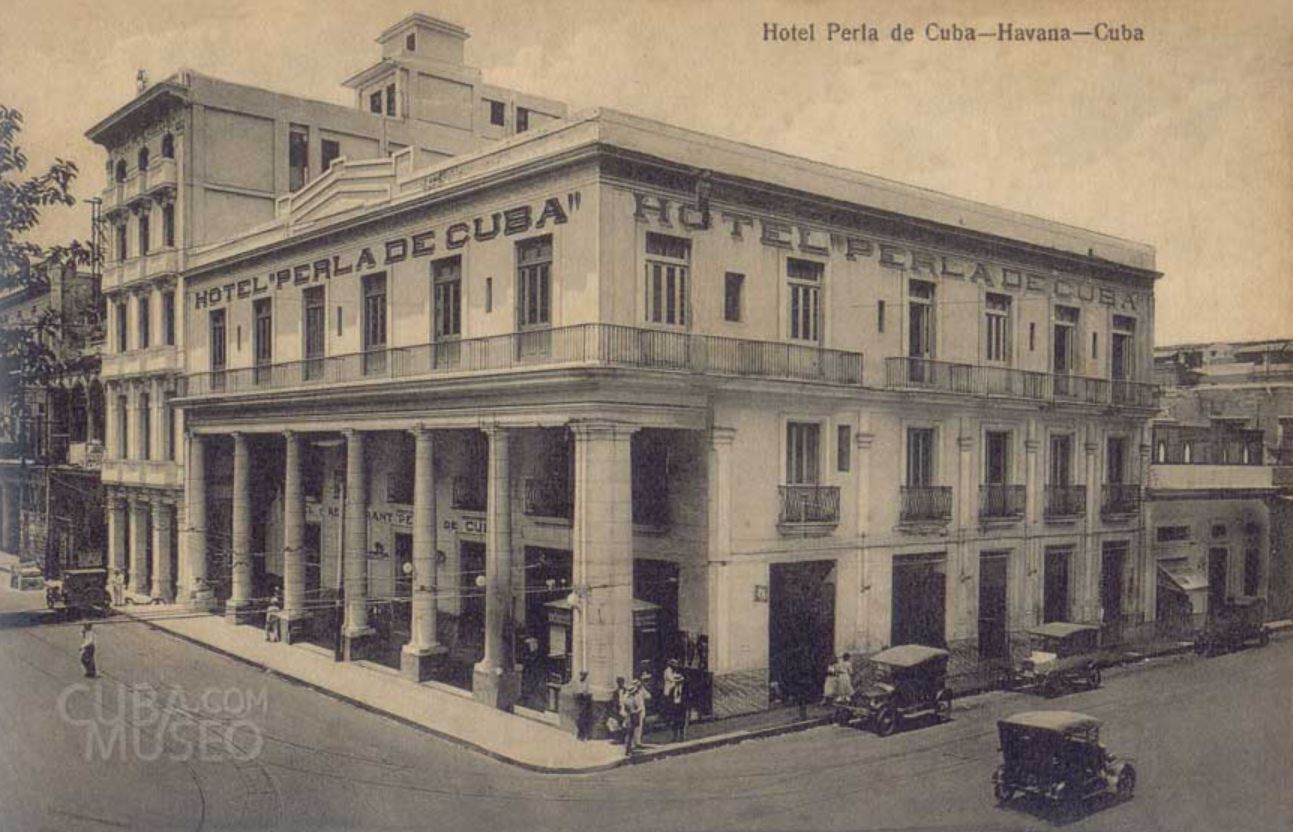
Hotel Perla de Cuba, corner, Havana

== See also ==
- Neoclassical architecture
- Royal Palm Hotel (Havana)
- Plaza del Vapor, Havana
- Havana Plan Piloto
- El Capitolio
