= Edward Girardet =

Edward Reinhard Girardet is an American journalist, editor, author and adventurer born in White Plains, New York on 24 March 1951. He is currently based between Bangkok, Thailand and Geneva, Switzerland, where he is editor of Global Geneva magazine, a print and online publication stressing quality journalism and focusing on so-called 'International Geneva' themes, such as humanitarian response, conflict mediation, climate change and Sustainable Development Goals.

== Early life and education ==
Having lived much of his youth in the United States, Bahamas, Canada and Germany, Girardet completed his high school education at Clifton College, a British public school in Bristol, UK, and then the University of Nottingham, where he studied German literature. On graduating, he went to Paris to become a foreign correspondent.

== Professional ==
As a reporter for The Christian Science Monitor, U.S. News & World Report and the PBS MacNeil-Lehrer NewsHour but now other media, he has covered wars and humanitarian crisis zones in Africa, Asia, the Balkans and Central America. He is widely regarded as one of the most informed international journalists on Afghanistan and humanitarian media issues. His latest book, Killing the Cranes, is considered a classic.

== Books ==
Girardet has written or edited various books, mainly about Afghanistan but also Africa and media. His 1985 book Afghanistan: The Soviet War was one of the first books based on personal experience about the Soviet war, the Afghan resistance and clandestine humanitarian cross-border support. He often trekked hundreds of miles across the Hindu Kush to report the Red Army war. Girardet was also the first American reporter to meet and write about Afghan resistance leader, Ahmed Shah Massoud in the summer of 1981. Girardet was one of the last visitors to Massoud in September, 1981 when he travelled up to northern Afghanistan to see the commander just before the latter was assassinated by two Al-Qaeda operatives. Posing as journalists, the two suicide bombers lived in the guesthouse room in Khoja Bauhouddin next to Girardet, who was on assignment for National Geographic. Girardet left several days before the assassination on 9 September 2001 because, as he wrote in Killing the Cranes, he had to get back to Europe for his wife's birthday on 13 September.

Girardet edited Somalia, Rwanda and Beyond: The Role of the International Media in Wars and Humanitarian Crises published by Columbia University Press and Crosslines Global Report in 1995. Girardet has co-produced and reported various television documentaries filming, sometimes clandestinely, in places such as Western New Guinea, Haiti, Zambia, Angola, Mozambique and El Salvador. He was reporter on the BBC2 documentary "Frontline Doctors" about Medecins sans Frontières (MSF) during the 1990s produced by French film-makers Christophe de Ponfilly and Frederic Laffont, and narrated by actor Daniel Day-Lewis. Girardet was also editor of Populations in Danger with MSF published by Routledge in 1996 and contributed the chapter on Liberia.

Together with British editor and former Gurkha officer Jonathan Walter, Girardet co-edited and wrote The Essential Field Guide to Afghanistan in 1998 published by Crosslines Global Report and Media Action International. This is aimed at helping aid workers, diplomats, soldiers, journalists and others to be better informed about Afghanistan. The most recent 4th edition of The Essential Field Guide to Afghanistan was published in February, 2014, which includes essays and briefs by writers such as Ahmed Rashid, William Dalrymple, Christina Lamb, William Dowell, Jason Burke and Girardet himself.

Girardet's latest book is Killing the Cranes - A Reporter's Journey Through Three Decades of War in Afghanistan published by Chelsea Green in 2011 and in French by Editions Les Arènes in Paris in February, 2014 as Il Parait Que Vous Voulez Me Tuer. Killing the Cranes includes a personal account of Afghanistan's nearly 35-year-long war including encounters with Islamic extremists such as Osama bin Laden and Afghan Hezb-e-Islami fundamentalist Gulbuddin Hekmatyar. As with other Afghan Pushtun and Islamic radicals, Gulbuddin was supported by the Central Intelligence Agency and Pakistan's military InterServices Intelligence (ISI) during the 1980s and is now a leading insurgent figure against the post-2001 US-led intervention in Afghanistan.

== Related Activities ==
Girardet was founder of the International Centre for Humanitarian Reporting (ICHR) which became Media Action International. He is a specialist in 'Lifeline Media', an idea initially propagated by Media Action International, providing needs-based humanitarian information to disaster victims. Girardet is an avid proponent of quality reporting for the coverage of wars, humanitarian crises and development issues. He has organized numerous workshops for local, regional and international journalists focusing on global themes, such as climate change, humanitarian response, the environment, access to health, and water. Girardet serves as a media consultant and strategic advisor to various United Nations aid agencies and non-governmental organizations on the need for more effective public information outreach through media as a means of promoting transparency and accountability. As editor of Global Geneva, Girardet seeks to highlight the need for credible and trusted journalism as crucial for any democracy. His magazine is also working closely with young people as part of its Youth Writes initiative to help develop writing skills but also to learn how to discern what is credible - and what is not - in social media in the age of false news and disinformation. Girardet is currently working on a what he describes as a "factual novel." Girardet is married and has two children.
