= Royal Palm Hotel (Havana) =

Former hotel in Havana, Cuba

Royal Palm Hotel, Havana
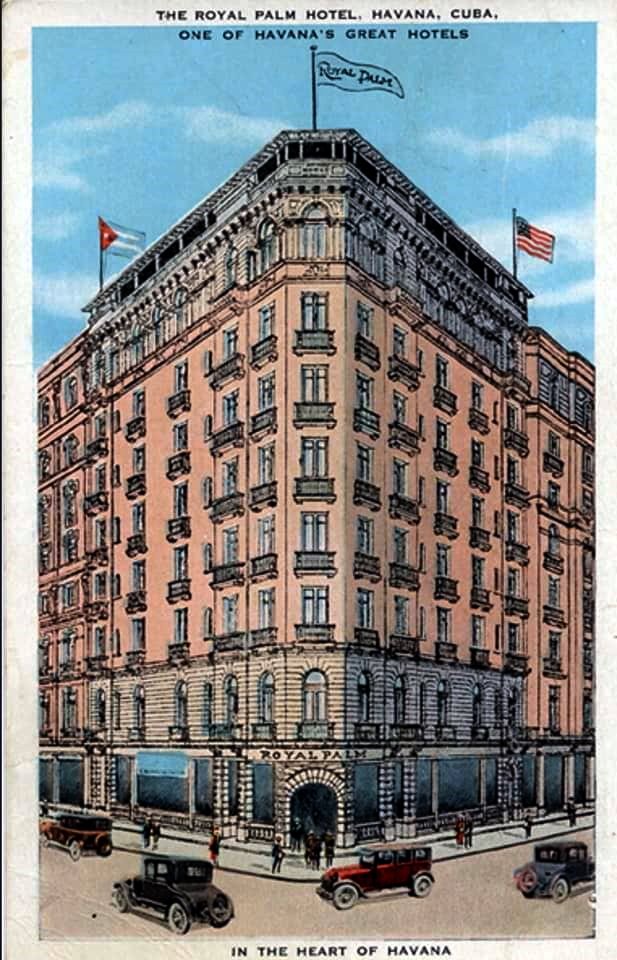
- Interactive map of the Royal Palm Hotel, Havana area

General information
- Location: Havana, La Habana Province, Cuba
- Coordinates: 23°8′13.34″N 82°21′39.17″W
- Inaugurated: 1923

Royal Palm Hotel (Spanish: Hotel Royal Palm) was a hotel formerly in Havana, Cuba.

== History ==
The Royal Palm Hotel, situated at San Rafael and Industria, two blocks from Parque Central, was centrally located in Havana, Cuba.

Originally the Luis E. del Valle Building (Spanish: Edificio Luis. E. del Valle), it was sold to Wilbur E. Todgham, who renamed it the Hotel Royal Palm and took on its ownership as managing director. Adjacent to Havana's Colón Park, it was a five-story, fireproof structure.

Designed by Cuban architect Horacio Navarrete, the Royal Palm had 200 rooms, all with private baths and telephones.

Described as Havana's newest hotel in 1923, it was designed to cater to American visitors and English-speaking travelers, with all staff speaking both English and Spanish.

By the mid-1920s, the hotel management conducted Royal Palm Sightseeing tours.

The hotel was purchased in the 1930s by Pascual Morán Pérez, a Spanish-born businessman known for his success in Cuban hospitality.

== Gallery ==
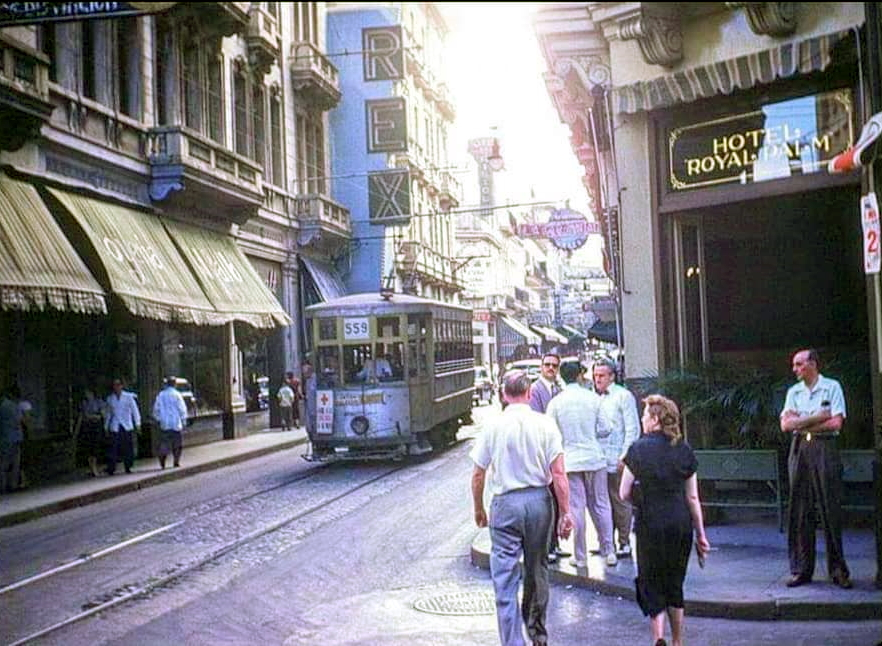
Royal Palm Hotel (Havana), entrance
