= Didone abbandonata (disambiguation) =

Didone abbandonata is a libretto by Metastasio.

It was set multiple times including:

- Didone abbandonata (Sarro) 1724 - original
- Didone abbandonata (Albinoni) 1724
- Didone abbandonata (Vinci) 1726
- Didone abbandonata (Hasse) 1742
- Didone abbandonata (Sarti) 1762
- Didone abbandonata (Jommelli) 1763
- Didone abbandonata (Galuppi) 1766
- Didone abbandonata (Mercadante) 1823

Other works on the theme include

- "Didone abbandonata", cantata by Giovanni Alberto Ristori (1692-1753)
- Didone abbandonata (Clementi) piano sonata
- Didone abbandonata (Tartini) violin sonata in G minor, B.g10

== See also ==
- Didone (disambiguation)
