= Didon =

Didon is the title of two French operas:

- Didon (Desmarets), a 1693 opera by Henri Desmarets
- Didon (Piccinni), a 1783 opera by Niccolò Piccinni

== See also ==
- Dido (disambiguation)
- Didone (disambiguation)
