= Dido, Queen of Carthage =

Dido, Queen of Carthage may refer to:

- Dido, founder and first queen of Carthage
- Dido, Queen of Carthage (play), a play by Christopher Marlowe
- Dido, Queen of Carthage (opera), an opera by Stephen Storace

== See also ==
- Dido (disambiguation)
