= Giuseppe Pirovani =

Italian painter

Giuseppe Perovani Rústica
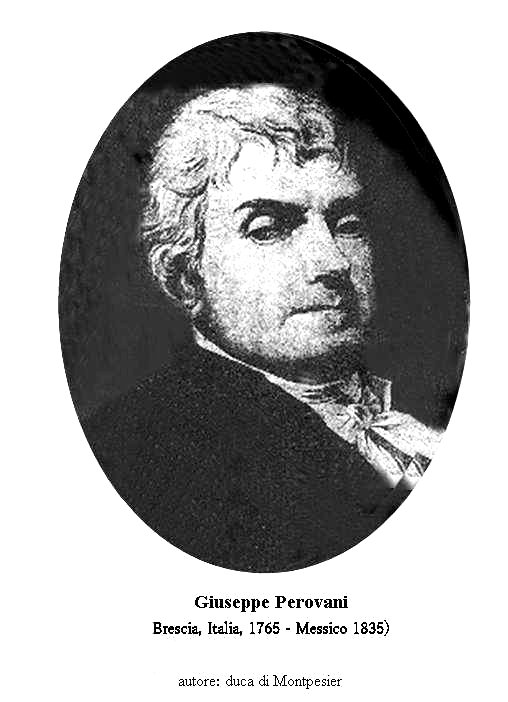
- Giuseppe Perovani (possible self-portrait)
- Born: c. 1759-65; Pavia/Brescia, Italy
- Died: 1835; Mexico City, Mexico
- Known for: Portraits, Murals, Frescos,
- Notable work: Portrait of George Washington. Painted altarpiece, St. Bernardo Tolomei Chapel, Santa Francesca Romana, Rome. Frescos & murals, Havana Cathedral, Cuba.
- Spouse(s): Jane Balduari Gordon (of Philadelphia, Pennsylvania, USA)

Giuseppe (José) Perovani Rústica (c.1759-65 – 1835) was an Italian painter of the Neoclassic period. He trained in Rome, and painted altarpieces in Brescia as a young man. He painted the altarpiece (and possibly the trompe l'oeil ceiling) of the Chapel of the Blessed Bernardo Tolomei in the Santa Francesca Romana in Rome.

In 1795, he traveled to Philadelphia, Pennsylvania, where he worked until about 1800. Following a short period in New York City, he moved to Havana, Cuba in 1801, where he completed a number of religious projects over some 14 years. The following 14 years he spent teaching at the Academia de Belles Artes de San Carlos in Mexico City, before retiring in 1829. He returned to teaching in 1834, but died the following year in Mexico City, during a cholera epidemic.

There continues to be confusion about Perovani's exact age, where he was born, and the spelling of his surname. (Note: Art historian Isodora Rose-De Viejo began researching Giuseppe Perovani in the 1970s. She has found no artist contemporaneous with him named "Pirovani".) He may have contributed to this: “In the New World, Perovani preferred to say he was ‘Venetian’. but in fact the artist came from the Brescia region of Lombardy.”

Although Perovani was best known for his religious works, his most famous painting is his Portrait of George Washington (1796), a variation after Gilbert Stuart's Lansdowne Portrait (1796).

== In Italy ==
According to an 1807 biographical sketch, Giuseppe Perovani was "accidentally" born in Pavia. His family was from Brescia, 116 km (72 miles) east of Pavia, where he was raised and educated. His father was a merchant, who noticed his son's affinity and ability for drawing. He sent young Giuseppe to study in Rome under Pompeo Battoni.

Perovani was the winner of a student competition to design a public palace for the United States. News of his work was sent to an envoy in Philadelphia [the Spanish Minister?], who invited the young artist to come to America.

It is possible that Perovani never returned to Europe. The 1807 biographical sketch was published in his home city of Brescia, and stated: If he is still alive, he would be around 48 years old. The sketch also misspelled his surname as "Pirovani". The sketch was printed in an 1807 biography of the 16th-century Brescian painter Lattanzio Gambara. The book's subtitle: “Added are brief notes on the most excellent painters of Brescia”.

== In the Americas ==
=== Philadelphia ===
Perovani and a fellow Italian painter arrived in the United States in early July 1795. Philadelphia then was serving as the temporary national capital, 1790-1800, while Washington, D.C. was under construction. Perovani's first commission in America was a painted ceiling for the residence (embassy?) of the Spanish Minister to the United States, José de Jáudenes y Nebot. Perovani mentioned this in a September 19, 1795 advertisement in Philadelphia's Federal Gazette:

PEROVANI, JOSEPH AND JACINT COCCHI, of the republic of Venice, Painters, have the honour to inform the public, that they arrived in this respectable city about two months ago. During a residence of several years in the city of Rome, they have given specimens of their art and talents in that city, as well as in several other cities in Italy, having been employed by Princes as well as private persons. Having understood that taste for the fine arts is rapidly increasing in these happy States, they resolved to quit Italy, and to try to satisfy the respectable citizens of America, by their productions. The kind of paintings they excel in, are as follows, viz. The first (Mr. Perovani) paints all kinds of Historical Pieces, Pourtraits of all sizes, and Landscapes, as well as in oil color as in fresco; the other Mr. Cocchi, all kinds of Perspective, Paintings and Ornaments; and both are able to paint any Theatre, Chambers, Departments, with Platforms in figures, and ornamented in the Italian taste: a small specimen whereof they have given in one of the saloons of the house of the Spanish minister here. The one of them likewise is a compleat architect, not only able to furnish the draft in the most compleat stile, but likewise to superintend the execution thereof. They may be found by enquiring at No. 87, Second street North.

The federal government relocated to the District of Columbia over the summer and fall of 1800. President John Adams first occupied the not-yet-finished White House in November, and the House of Representatives and Senate convened in the U.S. Capitol in December.

Perovani spent some time in New York City, before he and his wife, Jane Gordon, relocated to Havana, Cuba in 1801.

=== Havana ===
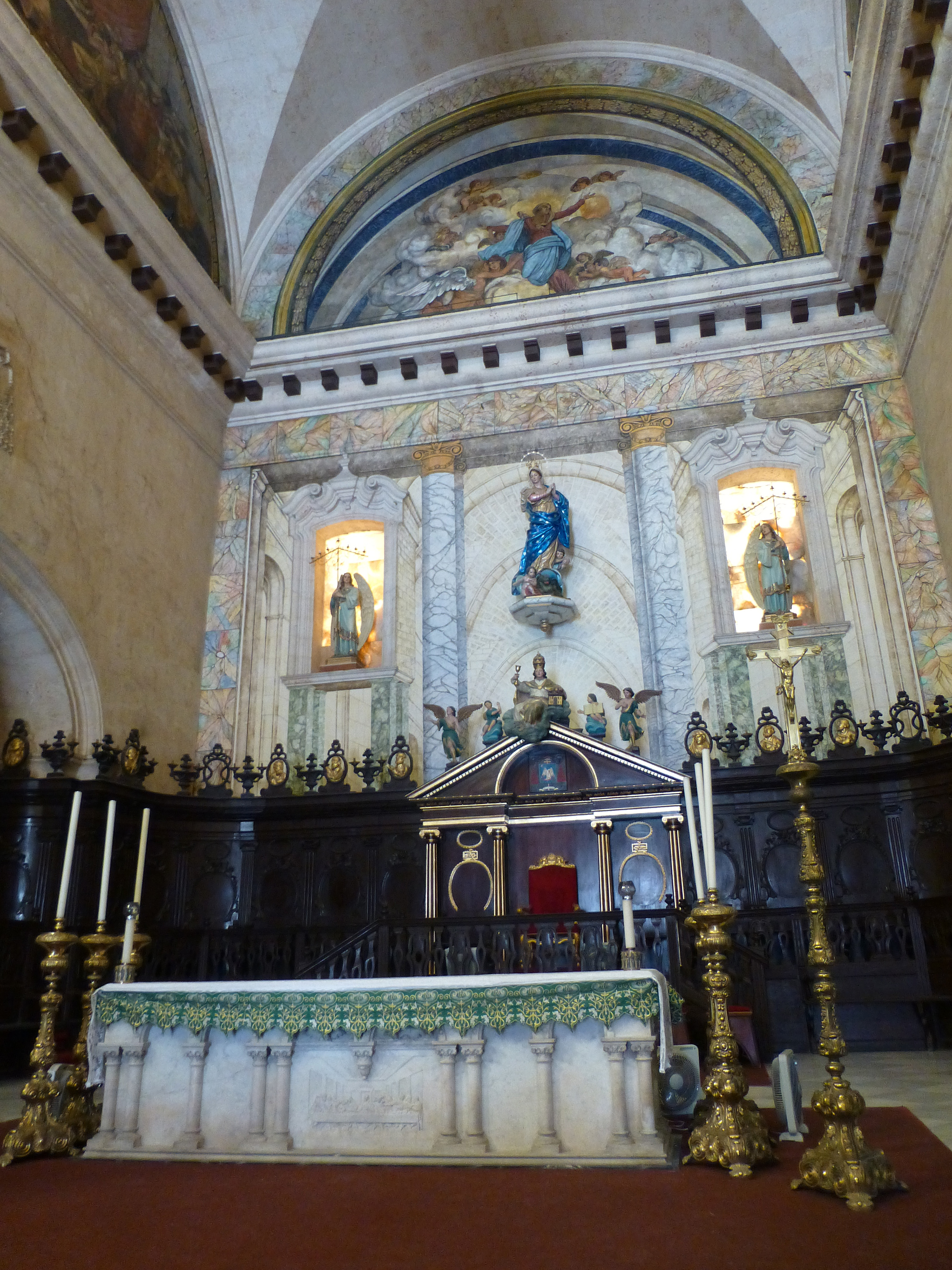
High Altar, Havana Cathedral. Perovani produced the architectural painting of the chancel. His Ascension fresco is at the top of the image

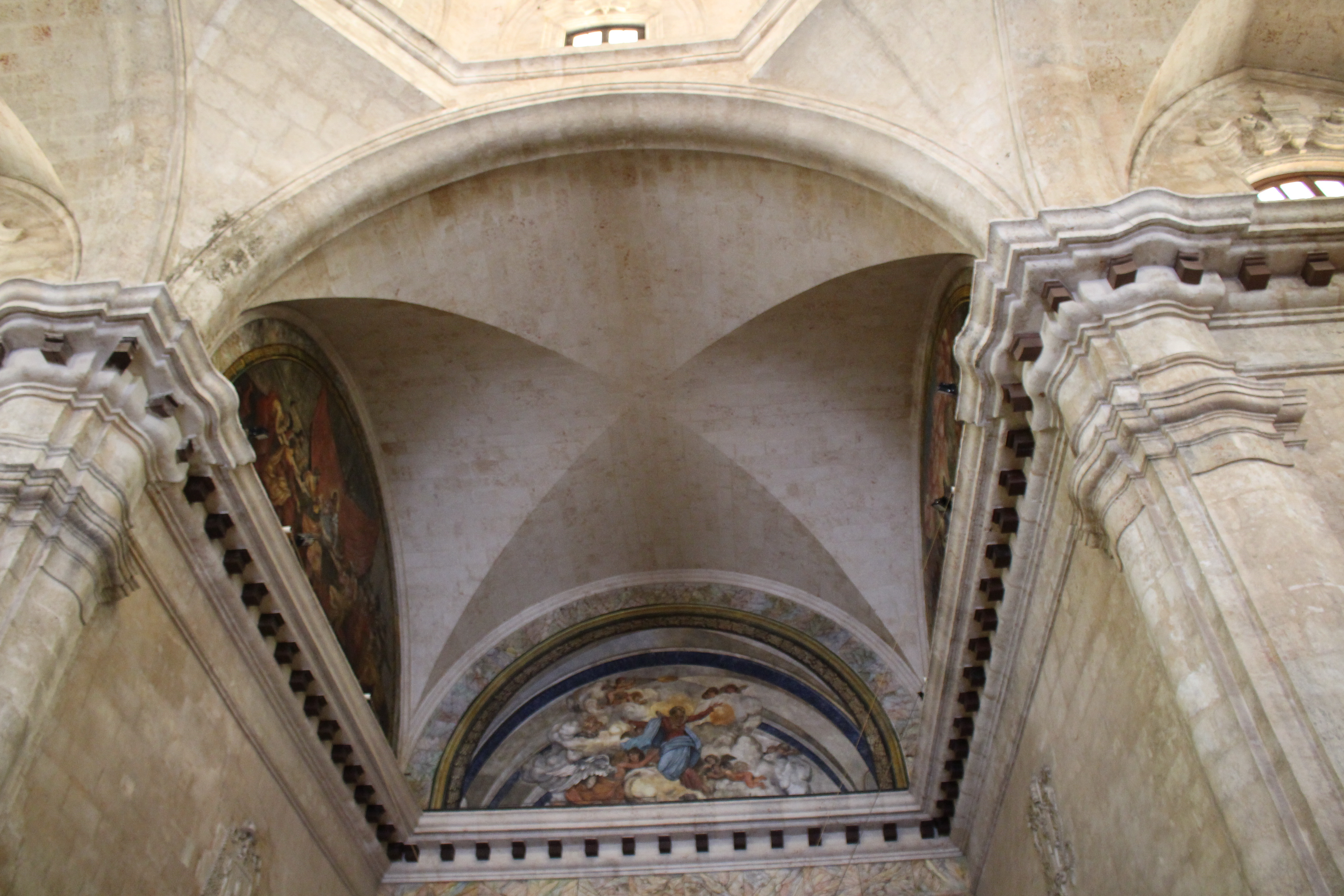
The Last Supper fresco (left), The Ascension fresco (center), The Delivery of the Keys fresco (right), Havana Cathedral, Cuba

The arrival of Monseñor Juan José Díaz de Espada y Landa in Havana in 1802, "ushered in a series of art and architectural projects." In 1803, Espada commissioned Perovani to create a fresco for Havana's Church of the Holy Spirit, along with two works in oil. That same year, Espada had Perovani create works for the Hospital de San Francisco de Paula.

Monseñor Espada's first major project was the Espada Cemetery (opened 1806, demolished 1908), built about a mile outside Havana's city walls.

Espada commissioned the Brescian painter Giuseppe (or José) Perovani (1765–1835), who had come to Cuba via Philadelphia around 1801, to paint frescoes of allegorical figures and Christian narrative scenes. Describing Perovani's now-lost Resurrection scene, Romay Chacón notes an angel with a trumpet telling the souls: “Rise up, ye dead, and come to justice.” To the angel's right, souls departed from their graves; to its left, the damned were shown horrified by their fate. Over the door and the two lateral windows, Perovani painted images of the three theological virtues: Faith, Hope, and Charity.

Perovani painted a fresco of The Final Judgement for the cemetery's chapel, but this has been painted over with whitewash.

In 1806, Monseñor Espada placed Perovani in charge of the interior decoration for Havana's Cathedral of San Cristóbal. Perovani's appointment was published in the Havana newspaper El Aviso Papel: Tuesday, February 4, 1806. Perovani did trompe l'oeil painting on the high altar, making the carved-wood altar appear to have been carved from white marble and jasper. He painted a life-size, full-length, oil-on-canvas portrait of the Virgin of the Immaculate Conception.

About 1808-10, Perovani began work on three lunette frescos high above and to either side of the high altar: The Last Supper, The Ascension, and The Delivery of the Keys. "Espada first commissioned Perovani, followed by the French expatriate artist Jean-Baptiste Vermay, to complete these paintings; however, we are unclear on the precise extent of each artist's contribution."

"Perovani established a painting academy at Havana and his wife (an American) taught foreign languages: English, French and Italian."

Perovani left Cuba in 1815, with interior work on the cathedral unfinished. Work continued under Perovani's assistant, French painter Jean Baptiste Vermay.

=== Mexico City ===
In 1809, Spanish-born artist Rafael Ximeno y Planes received the commission to paint a large fresco of “The Assumption of the Virgin” for the Catedral Metropolitana in Mexico City. With his thorough knowledge of fresco, Perovani assisted Ximeno on the work.

In 1815, Perovani and his family moved to Mexico City. He was elected to the Academia de Belles Artes de San Carlos, and the school's Director of Painting, Rafael Ximeno y Planes, appointed Perovani his lieutenant. The school put a strong emphasis on drawing, (Note: "[T]he promotion of drawing in the early years of the academy seems to have been an effort to provide students with the artistic training that local painters seemed to lack …") educating architects, draftsmen and botanical illustrators, as well as painters. Professor of Painting Perovani taught at the school until his retirement in 1829. About that same year, Mrs. Perovani opened another lay academy for girls in the planned city of Cárdenas, Cuba (founded 1828). Their daughter Elvira seems to have lived nearby, and may have helped at the school. (Note: Elvira Viuda de Torre Perovani [widow?] was listed as living in Cárdenas in 1889, although her mailing address was Havana.) Jane Gordon Perovani died in Cárdenas in 1832.

In 1834, at about age 75, Perovani returned to Mexico City, and began teaching in the Academia school. He died the following year in a cholera epidemic.

== Works by Perovani ==
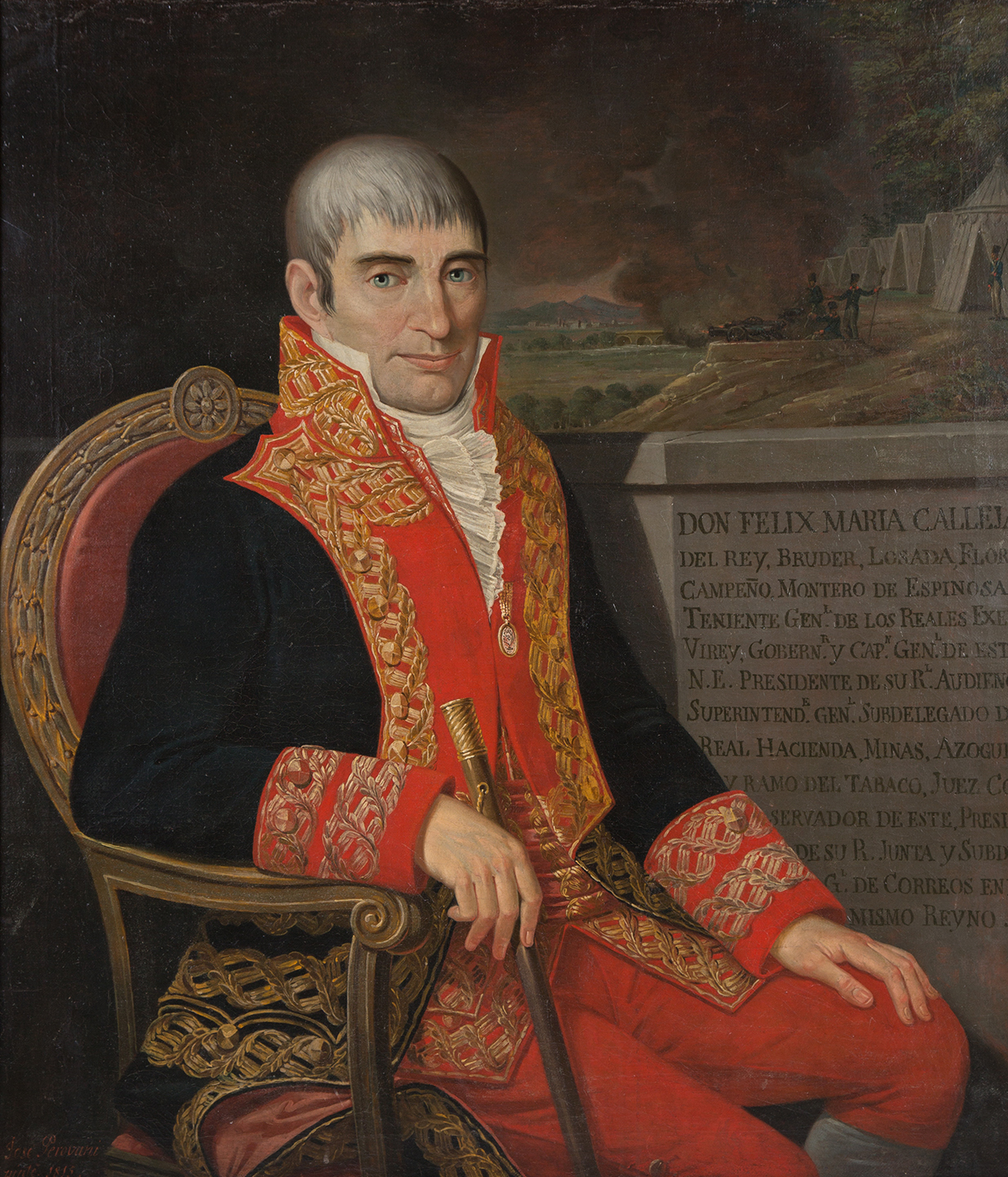
Giuseppe Perovani, Portrait of Viceroy Félix María Calleja del Rey (1815), Museum of National History, Mexico City

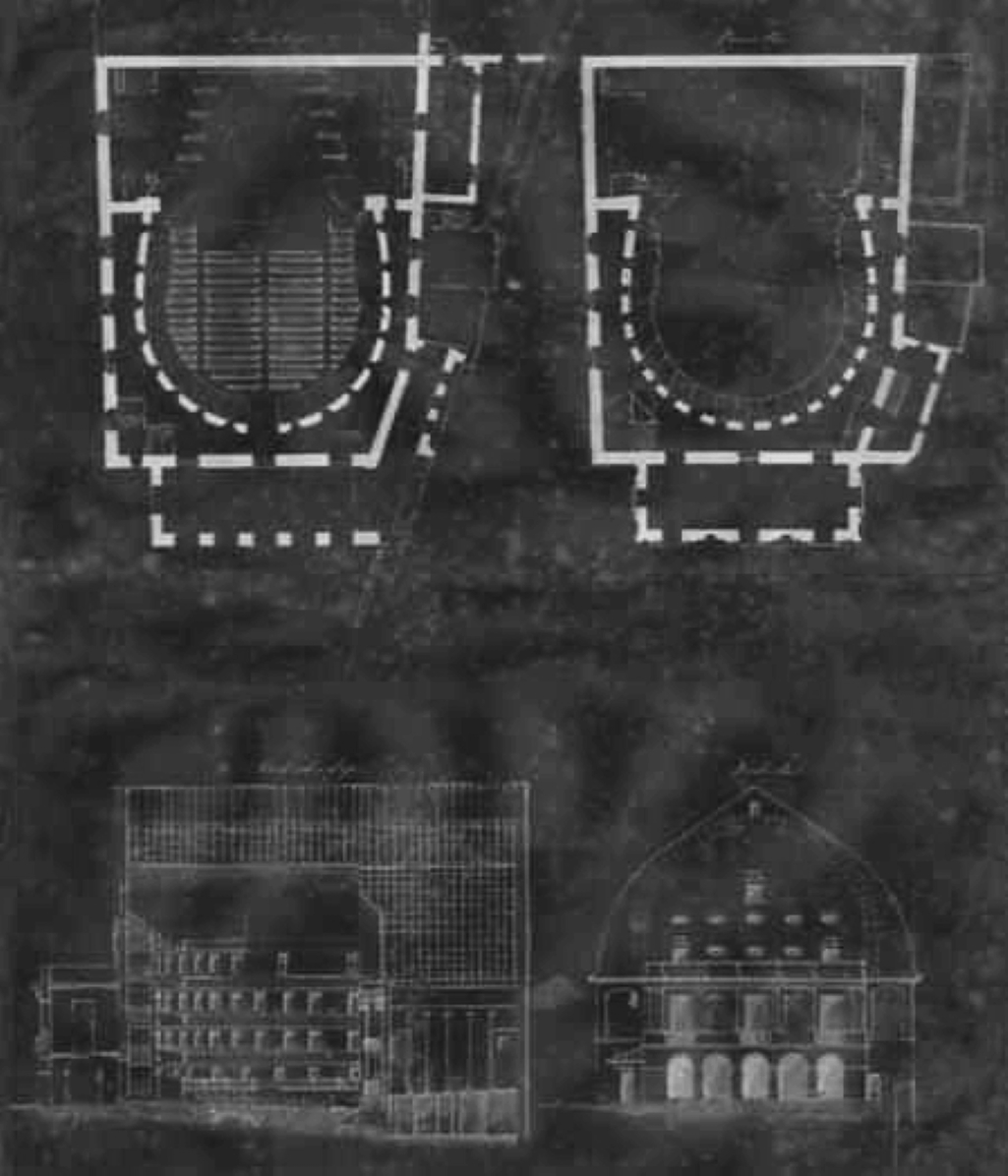
Coliseo of Havana, built 1775, restored 1803, demolished c.1850

- The Supper at Emmaus (1784), offered at auction, March 25, 2015. Unsold.
- Portrait of Andrea Memmo (1786). Memmo was a prominent Italian architect.
- Drawing: Orpheus, Singing His Bitter Pain at the Loss of Eurydice (1786). Pen, pencil, black ink and brown ink on paper. For sale at Galleria Carlo Virgillo & C., Via della Lupa, Rome, in 2020.
- Portrait of Cardinal Giovanni Andrea Archetti (1787), oil on canvas. Photo from Posterazzi. Collection: Castello Camozzi Vertova, Bergamo, Italy. (Note: Archetti was from Brescia, and held the Titulus Sancti Eusebii (title of "Cardinal priest of Sant'Eusebio", Rome) from 27 June 1785 to 2 April 1800. Perovani's grand portrait features a statue that may be related to the España statue in his Washington portrait.)
- Perovani's drawing of an ancient Roman anatomy school was made into an engraving by Antonio Fiori. This illustrated the 1788 edition of Bartolomeo Eustachi's Tabulae anatomicae, a textbook for surgeons and artists.
- Perovani apparently submitted architectural designs for a public hall in Philadelphia. This may have been the c.1794 student design competition in Rome, that led to the invitation for Perovani to come to America.
- Blessed Bonaventura da Potenza (by 1795), oil on canvas. Offered at auction, M. & C. Gelardini Arte, Casa d’Aste, Rome, 26 May 2023, lot 8. Unsold.
- Painted altarpiece: Saint Bernardo Tolomei at a Deathbed during the Siena Plague of 1348 (by 1795), Chapel of the Blessed Bernardo Tolomei, Santa Francesca Romana, Rome. Photo by David Macchi. The altarpiece is undated, but signed: “IOS. PEROVANI – PINXIT”. Dimensions: 1.4 x 3.5 m (4 ft 7 in x 11 ft 6 in). Perovani may have also painted the trompe l'oeil "domed" ceiling of the sidechapel. Photo by David Macchi.
- A probable 1796 Philadelphia work by Perovani:
  “On Washington's birthday, Feb. 22, 1796, there was an exhibition of ‘The Temple of Minerva,’ with a statue of the goddess contemplating a bust of Washington, all of which was the work of Joseph Peruani, an Italian painter and architect.” [underline added] (Note: This account was published in 1884. Although Perovani was not known as a sculptor, the description of him and spelling of his name are so close that Scharf & Westcott, writing 88 years after the event, may have mis-read Perovani's surname. This same "Peruani" error had appeared 28 years earlier in Humboldt's Cuba (1856): “There are two good promenades; one, the Alameda, inside the [city] walls, between the theatre and the hospice of Paula; and the other outside the walls, running from the Punta fort to the Muralla gate. The first was ornamented with much taste by Peruani [underline added], an Italian artist, in 1803." The "Hospital de San Francisco de Paula", for which Perovani painted works, and the "Hospice of Paula" may refer to the same building. Humboldt seems to have been the source of the spelling error in 1856; possibly repeated by Scharf & Westcott in 1884.) (Note: "Perovani was not boasting when he said that he could execute all types of painting. In 1796, we learn from [art historian Virgil] Barker, he announced “an exhibition of a statue of Minerva contemplating a bust of Washington.”)
- In 1803, Perovani created a painted ceiling and other work for the Coliseo of Havana, the city's opera house. The building was demolished c.1850.
- The Last Judgment (c.1806), Espada Cemetery chapel. Description: At bottom, a horrified sinner kneeling on a rock pleads for mercy, while surrounded by violent bare-chested brutes. At middle, several bodies hover between heaven and hell. At top, above the clouds, a youth plays a lute and people sit contented in an arcadian landscape. The fresco has been painted over with whitewash.
- Portrait of Viceroy Félix María Calleja (1815), oil on canvas, Museum of National History, Mexico City
- Self-Portrait (date unknown), 49 x 30 cm (19 ¼ x 11 ¾ inches). (Note: What purports to be an engraving of a portrait of Perovani is shown in the infobox. It appears to be an illustration from an Italian book ("Messico" is Italian for "Mexico"). If the "Duca di Montpe[n]sier" [sic] was the owner of the portrait, this may have been Prince Antoine, Duke of Montpensier (1824-1890), the youngest son of King Louis Philippe. If so, the engraving probably would date from between Perovani's 1835 death and the duke's 1890 death. The last holder of the title was Prince Ferdinand, Duke of Montpensier (1884-1924), who died childless. Thus the engraving could date as late as 1924.)

=== Washington portrait ===
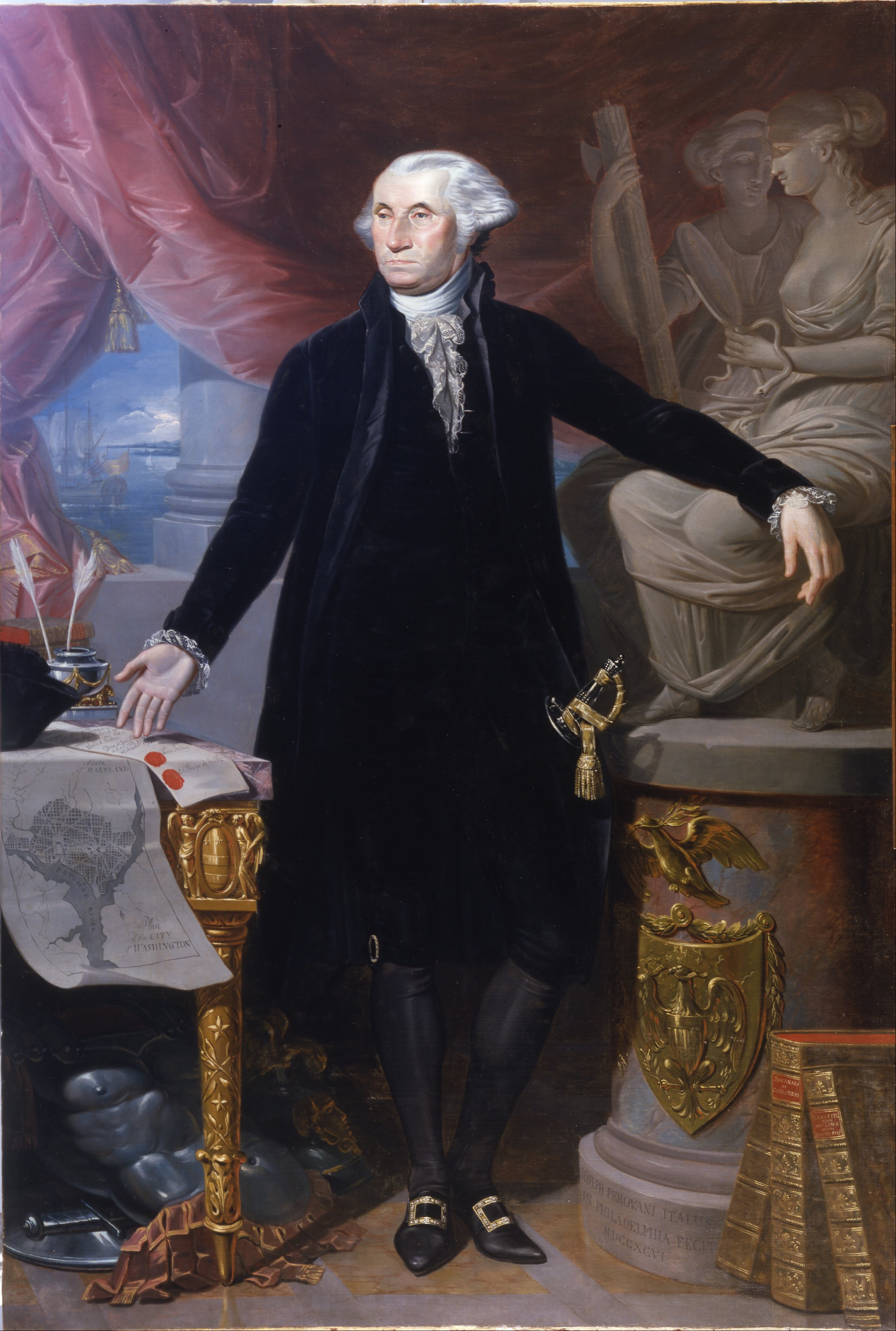
Giuseppe Perovani, Portrait of George Washington (1796), Royal Academy of Fine Arts of San Fernando, Madrid, Spain.

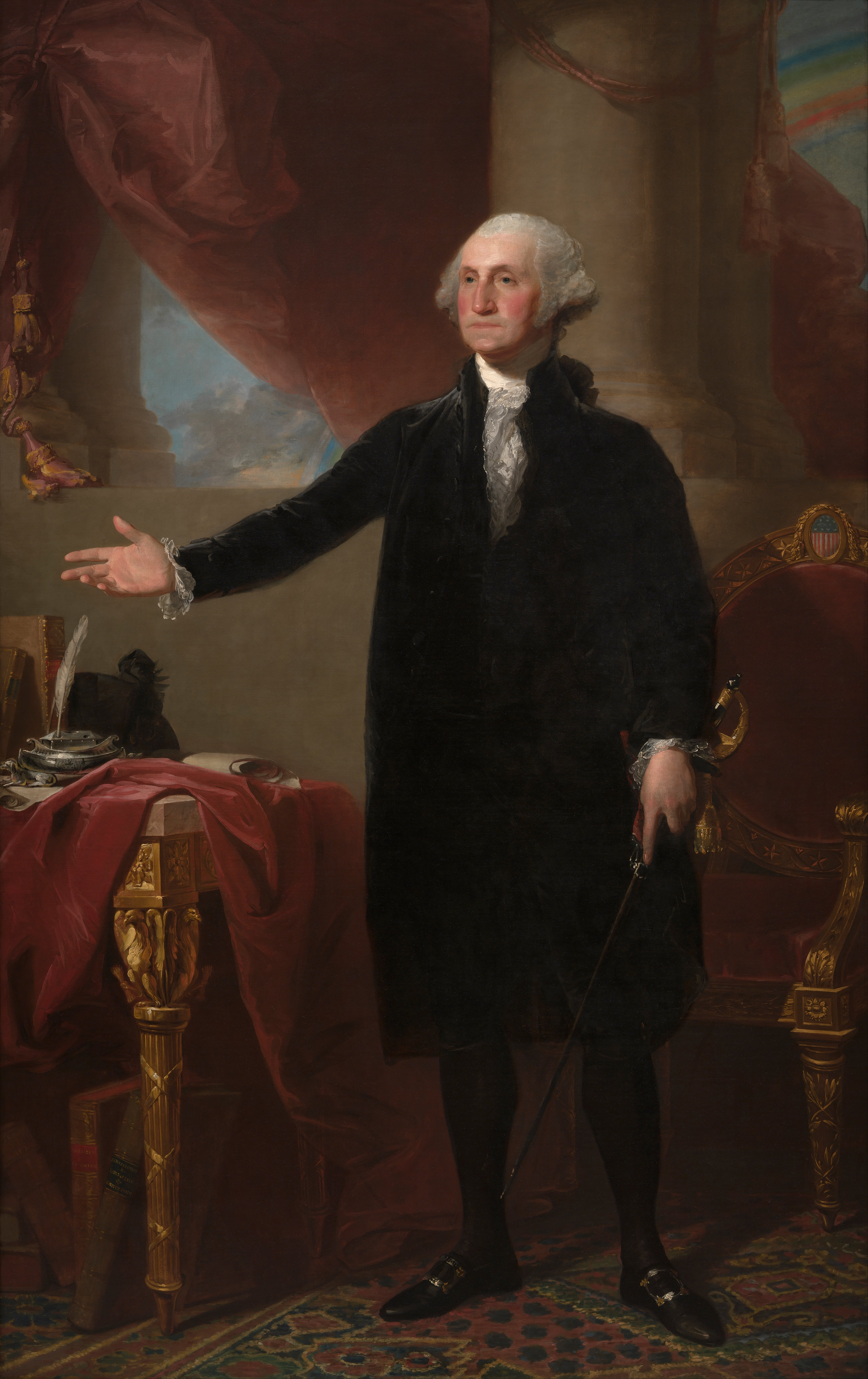
Gilbert Stuart, Lansdowne Portrait of George Washington (1796), National Portrait Gallery, Washington, D.C.

Spanish Minister Jáudenes sought to purchase a copy of the Lansdowne Portrait from Gilbert Stuart, but ultimately turned to Perovani.

Perovani's Washington portrait contains obvious elements from Stuart's portrait—the highly carved gold-leafed table leg—the sun breaking through the storm clouds—the thick volumes standing on the floor (one volume, Constitution and Laws of the United States, appears in both portraits). Washington is essentially dressed the same, and the positions of his head and right arm are similar. But Perovani adds details personal to Jáudenes.

Like Edward Savage's group portrait The Washington Family (1789–1796), Perovani features an image of Andrew Ellicott's 1792 engraving of Pierre Charles L'Enfant's plan for the District of Columbia. But Perovani has Washington gesturing not to the map, but to the 1796 Treaty of San Lorenzo, which set the border between the Spanish Territory of Florida and the United States. Jáudenes had been one of the two Spanish negotiators on the treaty, and Spain's Prime Minister, Manuel Godoy, had been the other. Jáudenes commissioned the Washington portrait to be a gift to Godoy, his friend and mentor.

The fanciful sculpture group upon which Washington rests his left forearm features allegorical figures of España and America embracing. Under the table are piled a shield, sword, and muscular breastplate, martial items set aside in peacetime. The pedestal of the sculpture group features an American eagle escutcheon and a flying dove carrying an olive branch. Perovani signed the portrait at the foot of the pedestal, as if it had been carved in marble: "JOSEPH PEROVANI ITALUS / IN PHILADELPHIA FECIT / MDCCXCVI [1796]".

Art historian Isadora Rose-De Viejo catalogued the art collection of Manuel Godoy, which included Perovani's Washington portrait. The portrait is in the collection of the Royal Academy of Fine Arts of San Fernando in Madrid.

== Personal ==
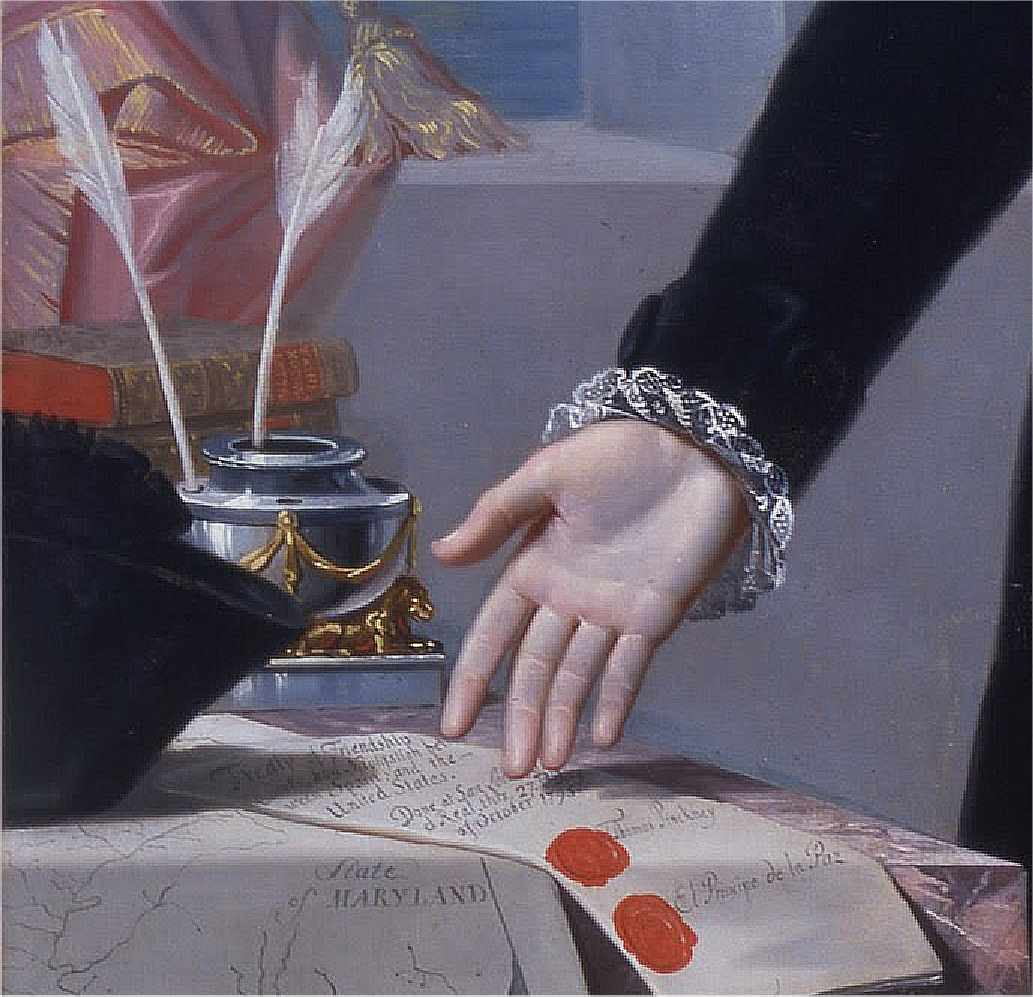
Detail: Washington's hand gestures to the Treaty of San Lorenzo

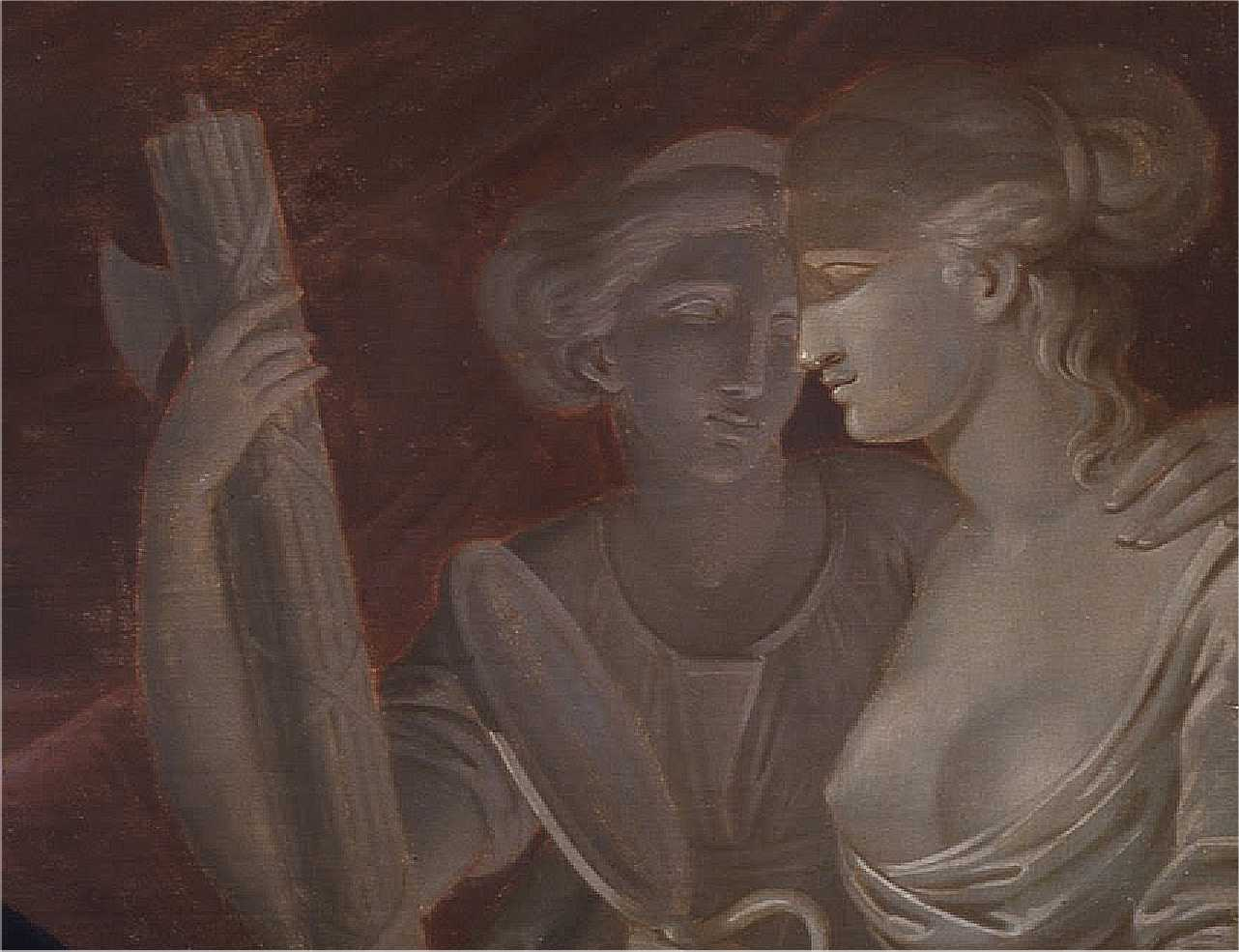
Detail: España and America embracing

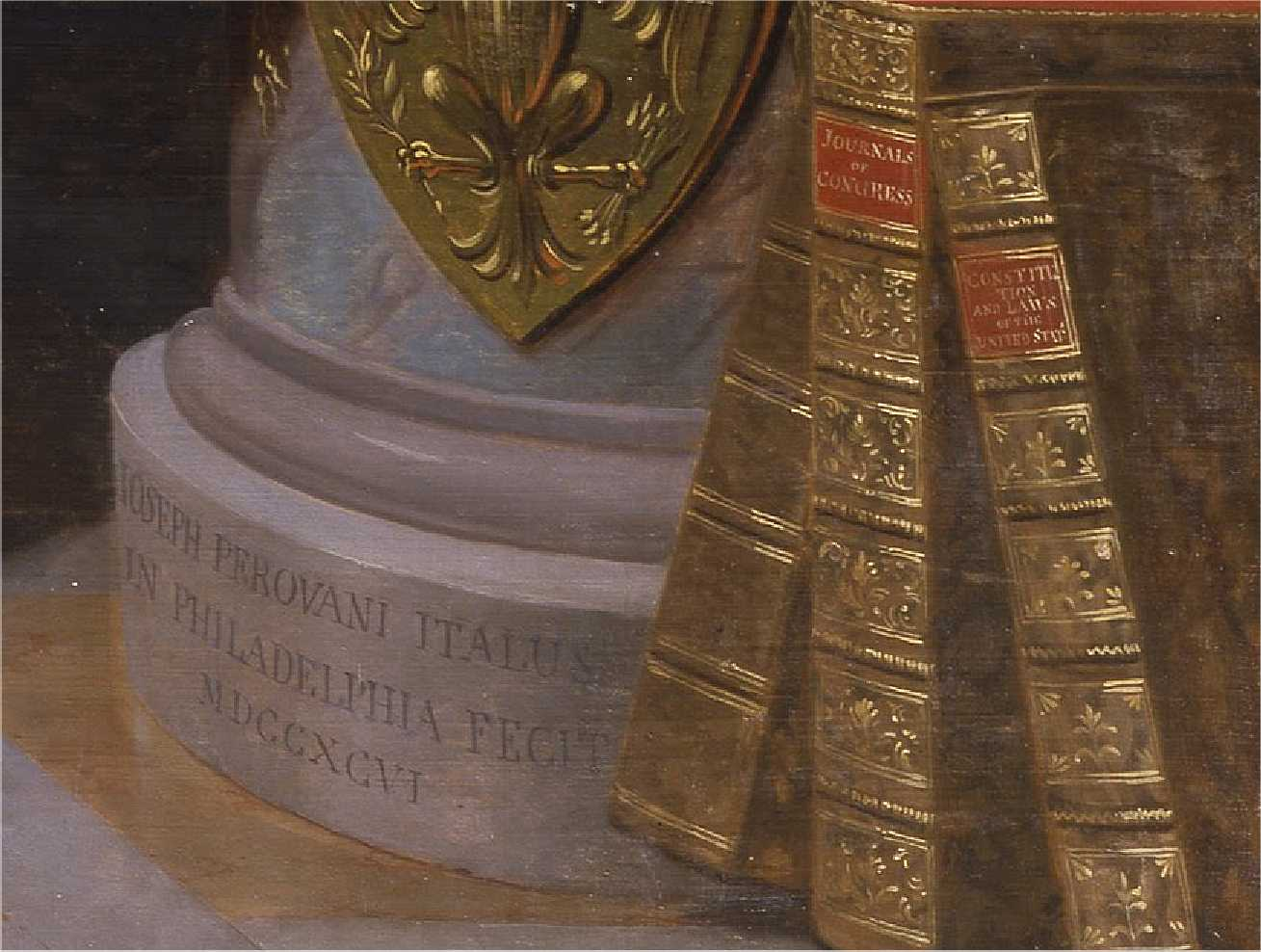
Detail: Perovani's name and date

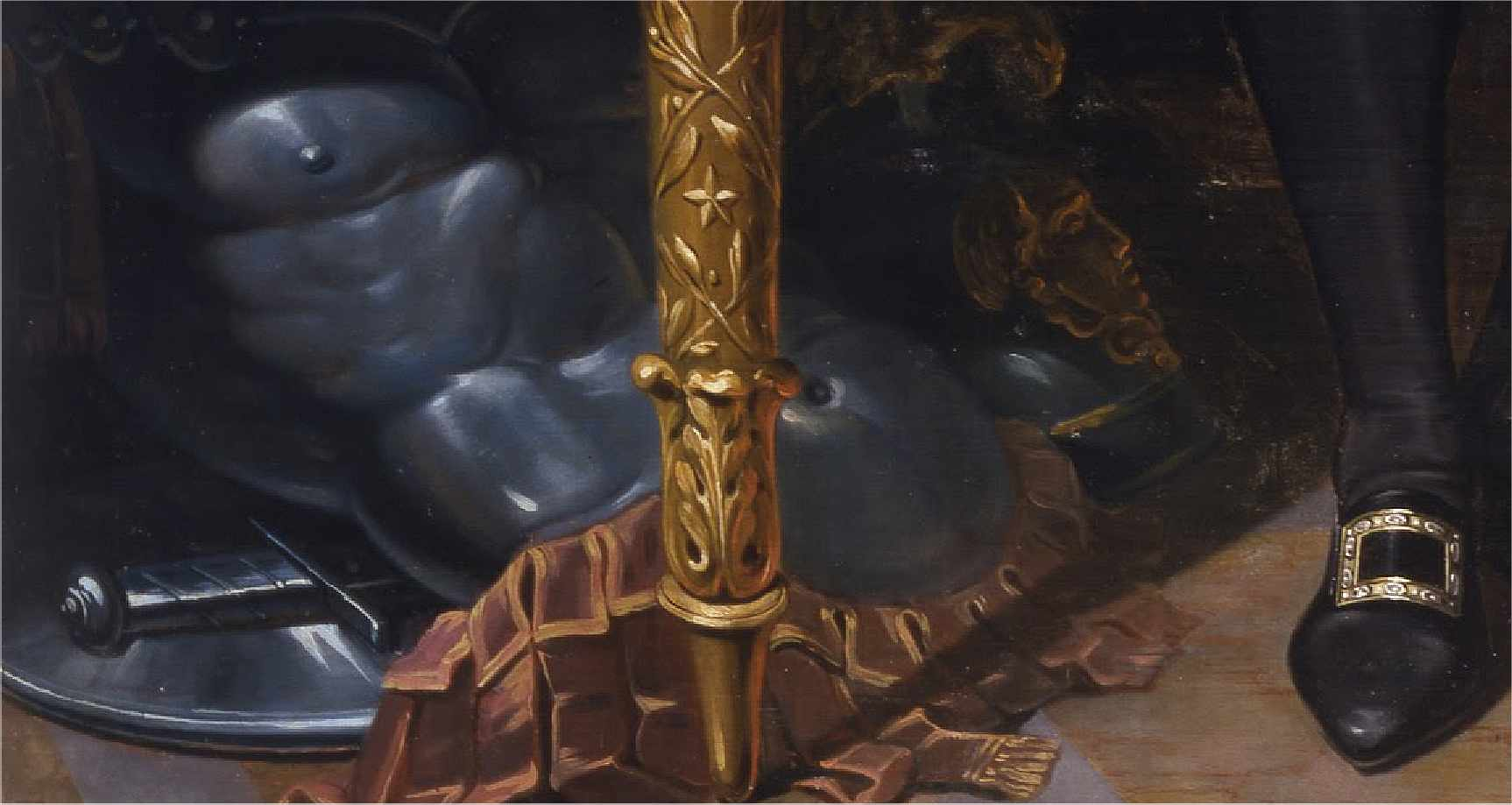
Detail: Shield, sword, breastplate, and helmet with the face of Athena

Giuseppe Perovani married Jane Balduari Gordon in Philadelphia. (Note: "The first lay teacher in Cuba who taught Cuban girls was a woman, Mrs. Jane Gordon Perovani, the wife of Mr. Giuseppe Perovani, a distinguished painter, born in Brescia, Italy. Mrs. Perovani came from Philadelphia, Penna, and she had there married the Italian artist who had made his home in the Quaker City shortly after the War of Independence.”) They had at least 4 children. In year, Mrs. Perovani became the first woman in Cuba granted a license to operate a school for girls, at which she taught English, Italian and French. About 1828, she opened a school for girls in Cárdenas, Cuba, but unexpectedly died there four years later.

=== Children ===
- Francisco Perovani Gordon probably was born in Philadelphia, about 1800. He died [unmarried?] at age 64 in Cuba, April 15, 1864, and was buried in the Espada Cemetery.
- Josè Eduardo Perovani Gordon, was born in Cuba, December 12, 1802, and baptized at the Cathedral de Havana, January 16, 1803. He married Rosa della Torre Armenteros, and the couple had 4 daughters and 2 sons.
- Elvira Perovani y Gordon (b.? - d. 1881), married Andrés de La Torre y Armenteros (c.1793 - 1864).
- unnamed daughter (b. by 1806 - d. by 1868), buried in Espada Cemetery. Identified only as "hermana" (sister) to Francisco Perovani Gordon.

=== Manuel de Zequiera ===
Cuban journalist and poet Manuel de Zequeira (1764-1846) was inspired by Perovani's work on the Cathedral and his frescos in the Espada Cemetery chapel (1806). Zequeira wrote a 13-stanza ode to Perovani, published in the February 4, 1806 issue of Havana's El Papel Periódico.

The ode's first and last stanzas:

Quién pudiera tu nombre con la lira llevar,
Perovani, a la futura gente?
Y en todo cuanto viva y cuanto siente
Tanta vida inspirar como la inspirar
Tu diestra diligente.

Yo también si pudiera, con la rama
Que Minerva cultiva en sus vergeles,
Coronara tu sien, y a tus pinceles
Colocara en el templo de la fama
Juntos con los de Apeles.

Who could proclaim your name with the lyre,
Perovani, to the people of the future?
And inspire in all who live and all who feel
As much life as is inspired by
your diligent right hand.

Also, if I could, with the branch
That Minerva grows in her orchards,
I would crown your temple,
And place your brushes in the Temple of Fame
Together with those of Apelles.

Espada Cemetery itself inspired Zequeira to write the brooding canto El Cementerio.

== Critical assessment ==
A biographical sketch of Perovani was published in New York in 1878:

PEROVANI (JOSÉ)—We also see the name "Perouani" written, and in [Humboldt and] Thrasher's work it appears as “Peruani,” which is undoubtedly incorrect.
He was born in Brescia, Italy, educated in Rome, married in Philadelphia with Juana Gordon, and moved to Havana, where he gave painting lessons in the spring [of 1801], while his wife opened an academy for girls, where for the first time they were taught French, English, and Italian. In Havana, Perovani painted his famous oil paintings “The Ascension” and “The Final Judgment” for the chapel of the new cemetery. He also painted several public and private buildings. The paintings that Zequiera most praised in a brilliant ode published under the pseudonym “Arnestio Garaique” in the Papel Periodico on February 4, 1806, are still preserved in the cathedral.
Perovani accompanied the principal Frenchmen on their excursions around the island, (Note: Three brothers: the Duc de Orleans (the future King Louis Philippe of France), the Duc de Montpensier and the Count de Beaujolais lived in exile in Cuba, 1798-99. See: Alexander von Humboldt, Political Essay on the Island of Cuba (1826).) and Count Beaujolais, who was fond of art, [had Perovani] paint his portrait. [Perovani] then left for Mexico, but was overtaken by the Revolution, and there, on the eve of returning to Havana, where he planned to establish an academy, he died at the age of 70 in 1835. (Note: There are major inconsistencies in the 1878 biographical sketch: Future King of France Louis Philippe and his younger brothers lived in exile in Cuba from Spring 1798 to Fall 1799. Perovani and his wife didn't leave the United States for Cuba until 1801. There's a 16-year gap between the [likely-imaginary] portrait of Count Beaujolais (1799) and Perovani's move to Mexico (1815); and a 20-year gap between that and the Texas Revolution/Perovani's death (1835).)

An appraisal of Perovani from a 20th-century critic:

"Already by 1805, Monseñor Espada had required for the decoration of our cathedral and some other churches and some chapels the services of that pathetic wandering Italian—José Perovani—whose dearest ideal in life had been that of founding an academy of art: something that he had not accomplished in the United States or in Cuba or in Mexico, where he at length left his septuagenarian bones. His stay among us was productive perhaps of not a little success and influence."

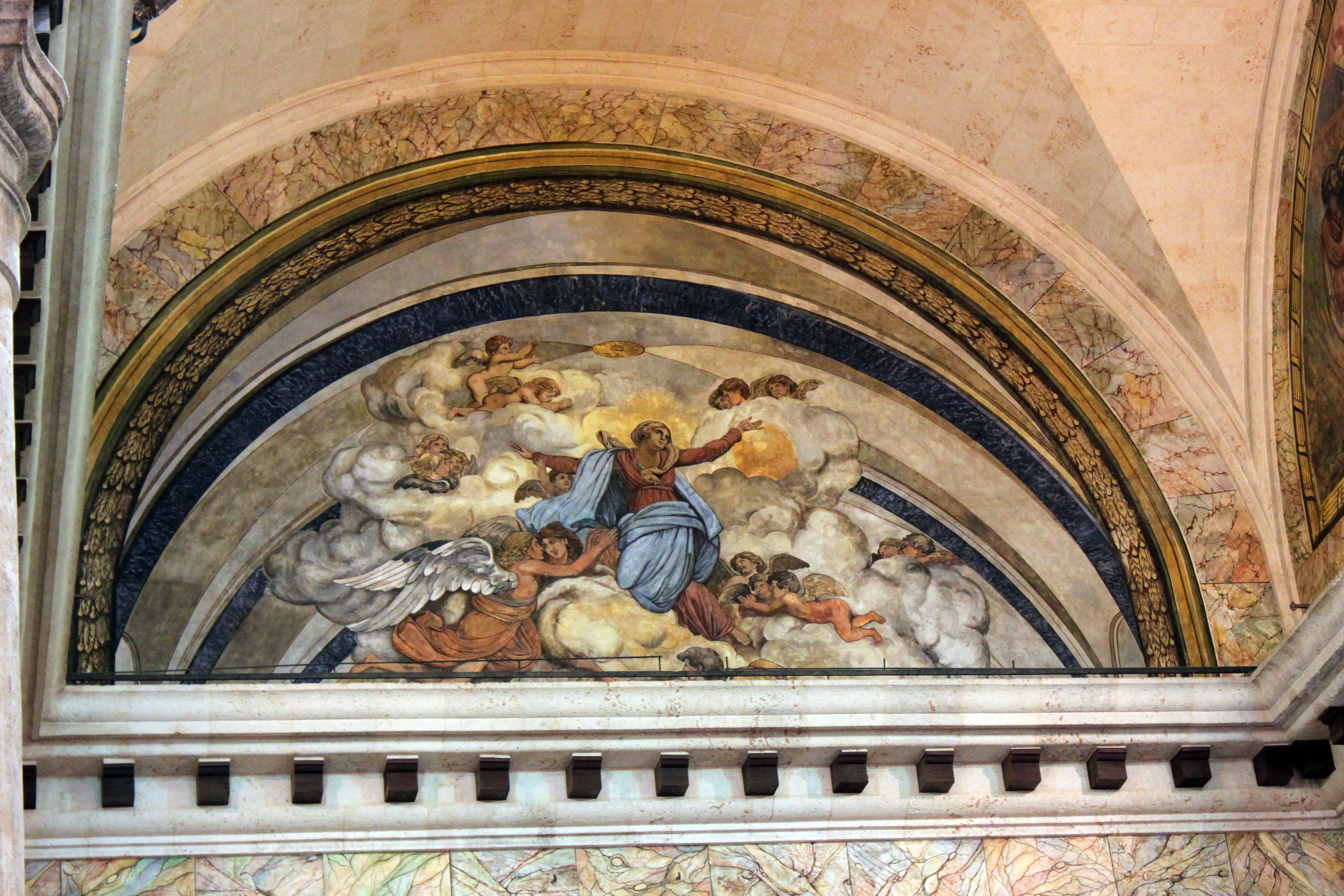
The Ascension fresco (1810-15), Havana Cathedral

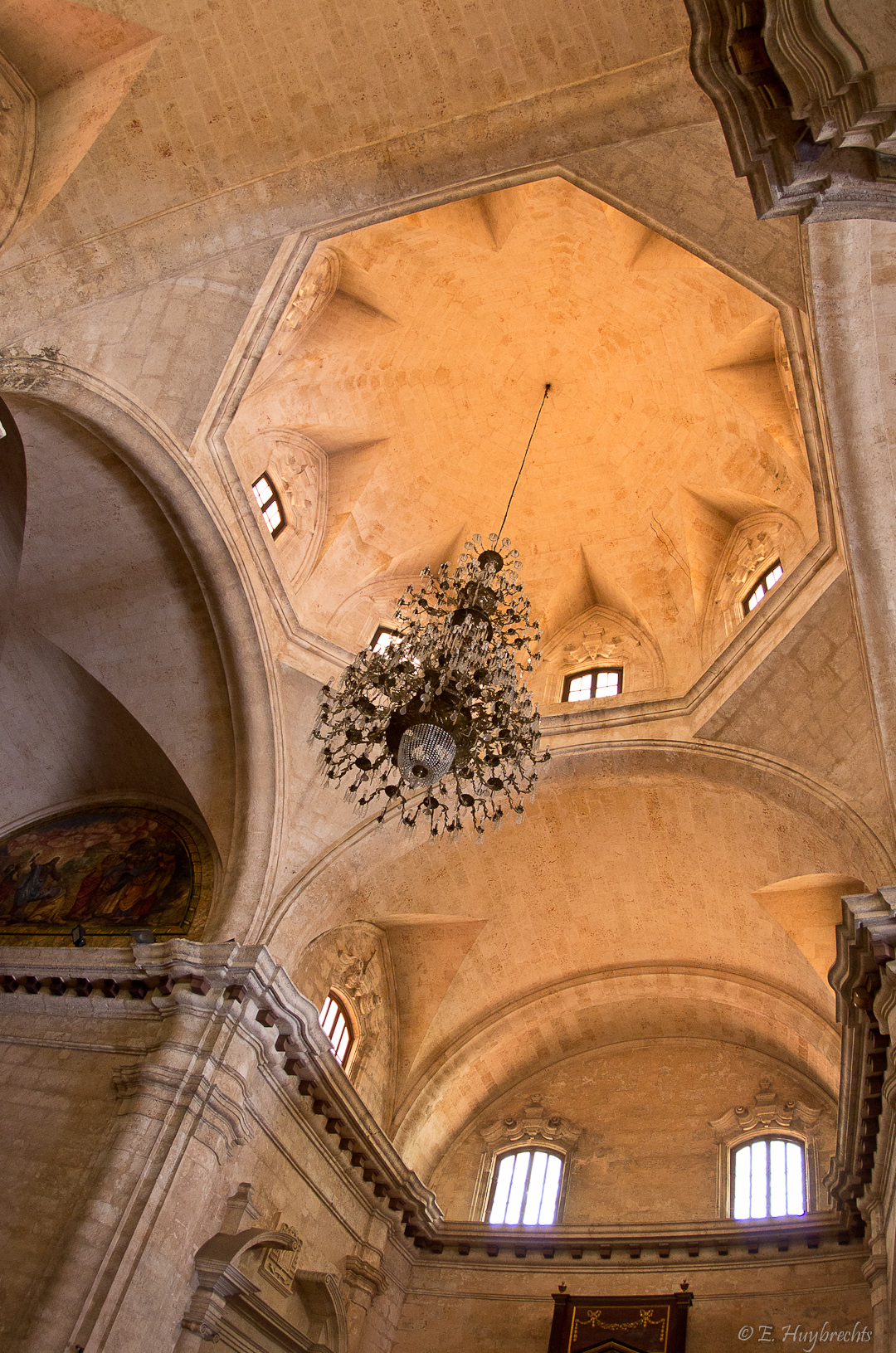
The Bringing of the Keys fresco (1810-15), Havana Cathedral (far left)
