= Didone abbandonata (Vinci) =

- Opera by Leonardo Vinci
- Librettist: Metastasio
- Language: Italian
- Based on: Didone abbandonata
- Premiere: 1726; Teatro delle Dame, Rome

Leonardo Vinci, Didone abbandonata, title page of the libretto, Rome, 1726.

Didone abbandonata is a setting by Leonardo Vinci of the libretto Didone abbandonata by Metastasio first set to music by Domenico Sarro in 1724. It was premiered at the Teatro delle Dame for the 1726 Carnival season in Rome.

== Recording ==
- Roberta Mameli (Didone), Carlo Allemano (Enea), Raffaele Pé (Iarba), Gabriella Costa (Selene), Marta Pluda (Araspe), Giada Frasconi (Osmida), Alessandra Artifoni (harpsichord), Giovanni Bellini (theorbo) Orchestra del Maggio Musicale Fiorentino, Carlo Ipata DVD Teatro Comunale di Firenze Dynamic 2017
