= Coliseo of Havana =

El Coliseo of Havana
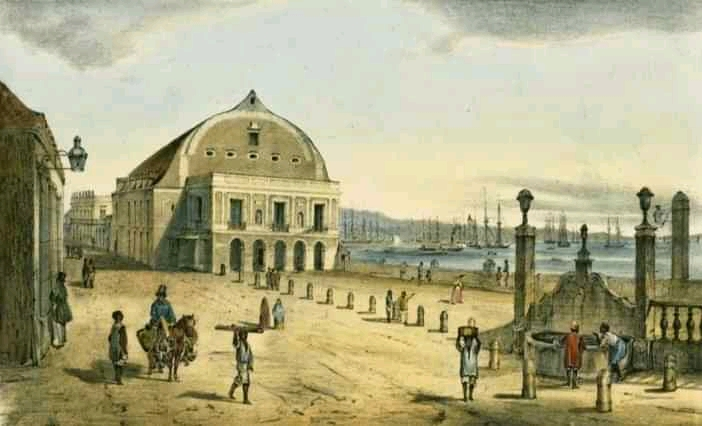
- Interactive map of the El Coliseo of Havana area

General information
- Type: Theatre
- Location: Havana, Cuba
- Coordinates: 23.1338499°N 82.3477622°W
- Opened: 1775

Technical details
- Structural system: Load bearing
- Material: Masonry, wood
- Grounds: La Alameda de Paula, Havana

Design and construction
- Architect: Antonio Fernández de Trebejos y Zaldívar
- Known for: First Havana theatre

The Coliseo of Havana was the first theatre built in Havana, completed on January 20, 1775. It was built near the Alameda de Paula between Calles Acosta, Oficios, and Luz, in Old Havana.

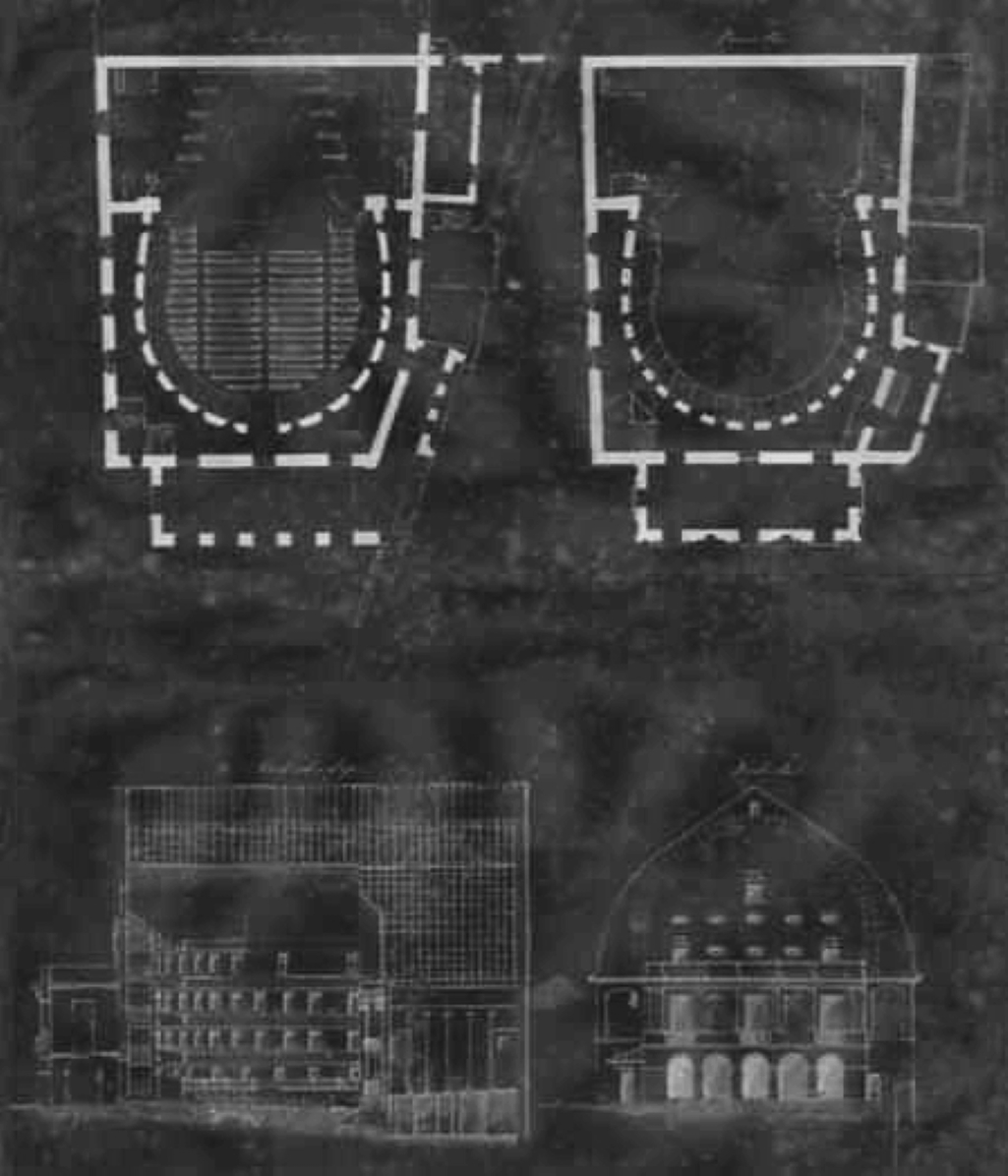
Coliseo of Havana, architectural drawing, building plans

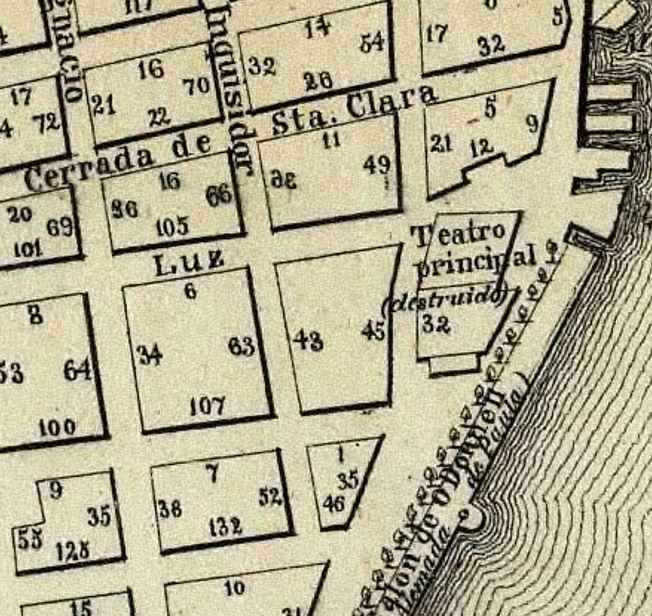
Partial 1853 Havana map_Coliseo of Havana

The theatre was the site of the first ever opera performed in Havana. The opera was Didone abbandonata, a work that featured a libretto by Pietro Metastasio.

The building had 4 stories of box seating, it contained seating on the ground floor, a stage, and services.

Coliseum was in poor condition and closed in 1788. A repair was carried out on it and, later, in 1803, it reopened its doors under the name El Principal. The theatre continued popularity until it was heavily damaged by a cyclone in 1846. However, there was a general repair project in 1847. In an 1853 map of Havana, the 'Teatro Principal' is shown as "destruído".

== See also ==
- La Alameda de Paula, Havana
- Palacio del Segundo Cabo
- Antonio Fernández de Trebejos y Zaldívar
- Palacio de los Capitanes Generales
