= Didone =

Didone may refer to:

- Dido, also known as Didone, character in multiple operas and artworks
- Didone (opera), of 1640 by Francesco Cavalli
- Didone (typography), a genre of serif typeface

== See also ==
- Dido (disambiguation)
- Didone abbandonata (disambiguation)
