= Didone abbandonata (Galuppi) =

Opera by Baldassare Galuppi (1740)

Didone abbandonata is a 1740 setting by Baldassare Galuppi of the libretto of the same name by Metastasio.

== Recording ==
- Didone - Stefania Grasso
- Enea - Federica Giansanti
- Selene - Maria Agresta
- Araspe - Federica Carnevale
- Jarba - Andrea Carè
- Osmida - Giuseppe Varano
- Conductor Franco Piva

Ed. Bongiovanni
