= Didone abbandonata (Clementi) =

III. Allegro agitato, e con disperazione

Didone Abbandonata - Piano Sonata in G minor, Op. 50, No.3 is the final sonata published by Muzio Clementi. It is dedicated, along with the first two works in opus 50, to Luigi Cherubini.

It is the only example of programmatic music in Clementi's oeuvre, telling the story of Virgil's tragic heroine Dido. The title was likely taken from Metastasio's 1724 opera libretto of the same name which had been set by or referred to dozens of times by composers throughout the 18th century. Clementi was likely familiar with Sacchini's popular 1775 production of Metastasio's libretto at the King's Theater in London. In 1929, Oliver Strunk proposed this piece (among dozens others) to the American Classical League as possible music to accompany their Virgil bimillennial celebrations.

The piece follows the conventions of classical fast-slow-fast sonata form. Anselm Gerhard identifies all three of this sonata's movements as containing substantial material all derived from a motivic cell presented during the introduction. The first movement opens with a short largo introduction subtitled "scena tragica", followed by a allegro ma con espressione. The first movement's exposition is an early example of a three-key exposition, in an i-III-v progression, with the second theme in the major mediant being particularly long and melodically complex. The second movement is an adagio in G minor, and the final movement is marked Allegro agitato, e con disperazione.

Clementi first published the opus 50 sonatas in 1821, simultaneously publishing them in London, Paris, Leipzig, and Milan. As with the rest of Clementi's published works, no known autograph manuscript survives. Leon Plantinga's research suggests that they may have been written as early as 1802. Clementi assigned metronome markings to all the movements, a practice that he had eagerly adopted starting in 1817 (after the widespread introduction of Maelzel's metronome in 1814).

Anton Schindler owned a copy of this sonata annotated by Clementi, the markings likely made when Schindler visited Clementi in Baden bei Wien in 1827. Schindler would go on to write the preface to the 1856 edition published by the André firm of Offenbach. Another historical edition was edited by Ignaz Moscheles in 1857 for Hallberger.

== Notable recordings ==
- Folkways Records FM 3342, played by John Newmark on a Clementi piano from 1810.
