= Palacio de los Capitanes Generales =

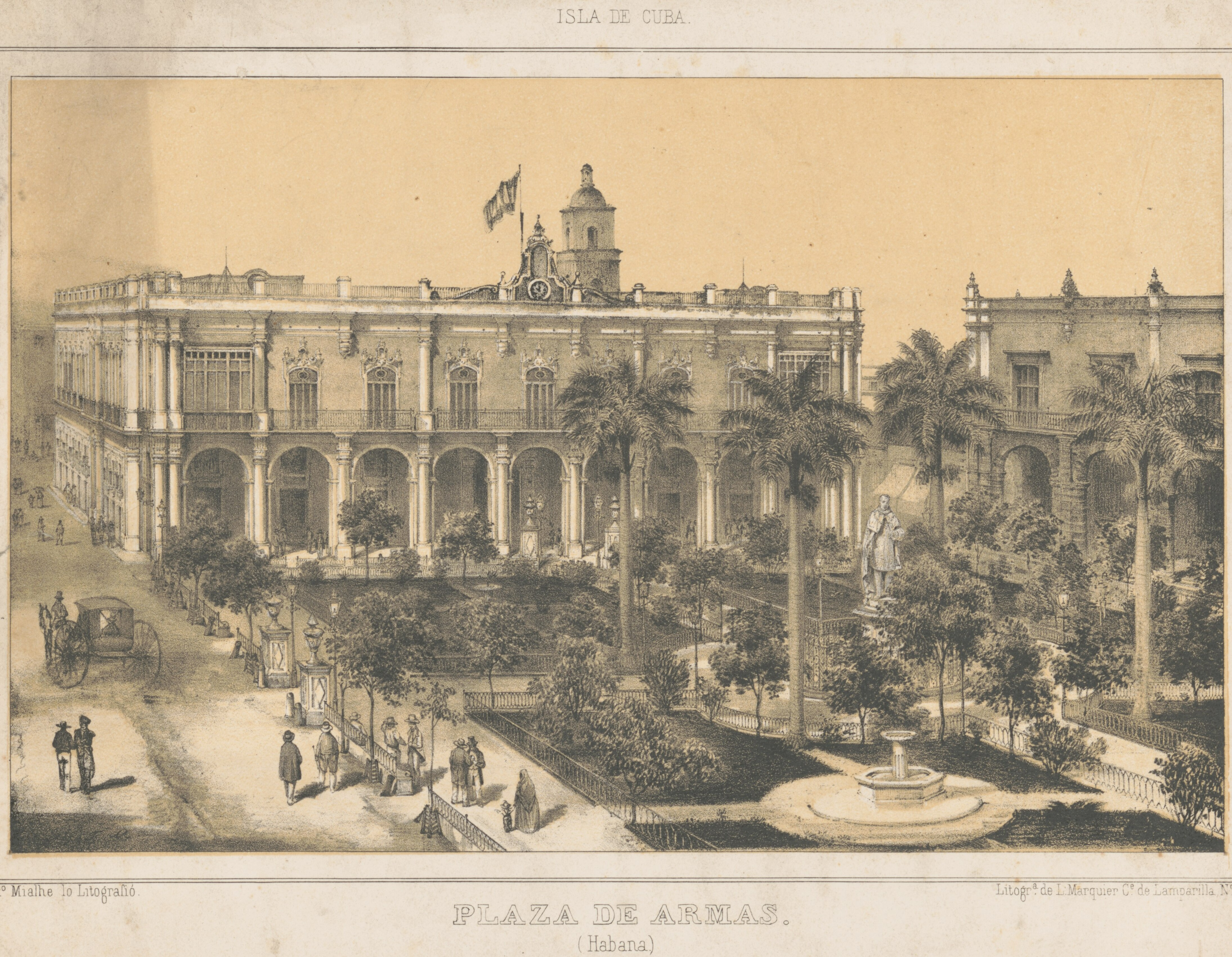
- Palacio de los Capitanes Generales in 1848, from Viaje Pintoresco alrededor de la Isla de Cuba.
- Interactive map of the Palacio de los Capitanes Generales area

General information
- Location: Ciudad de La Habana, Cuba
- Elevation: 23°8′23.84″N 82°21′0.95″W

The Palacio de los Capitanes Generales is the former official residence of the Spanish Empire's governors (Captains General) of Havana, Cuba, and in the Post-Colonial Period was for many time the City Hall. Located on the eastern side of the Plaza de Armas in Old Havana it is home to the Museum of the City of Havana (Museo de la Ciudad). It houses exhibitions of art and historical artefacts and many of the rooms are preserved with their original Colonial decoration.

Considered the most notable Colonial Baroque building in Havana. It is part of the UNESCO World Heritage Site "Old Havana and its Fortification System".

== History ==
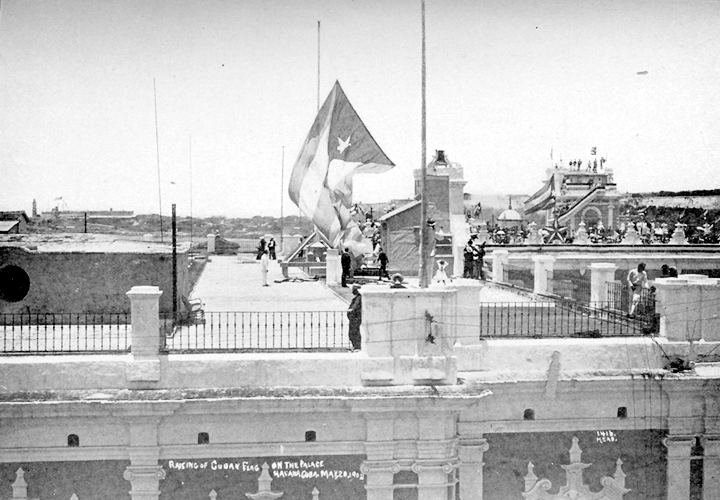
Raising the Cuban flag on the Palacio de los Capitanes Generales at noon on May 20, 1902

The plan for the building was put forward to the city council on 28 January 1773 by the governor Felipe de Fondesviela y Ondeano, marqués de la Torre. He proposed that the Parroquial Mayor church be demolished, the square be redesigned in keeping with the grandeur of the developing city and the Palacio de los Capitanes Generales constructed on the eastern side of the square in imitation of Royal Post Office (which would later become the Palacio del Segundo Cabo, the residence of the vice-governors) which had been constructed on the northern side of the square alongside the Castillo de la Real Fuerza. Construction from the designs of the Cuban engineer and architect, Antonio Fernández de Trebejos y Zaldívar, who had already been responsible for the much-admired post office, commenced in 1776. Much of the material used in the construction was imported to ensure it was of the finest quality: the bricks from Málaga, wrought-iron grilles from Bilbao and marble from Genoa, but the building work was carried out by slaves and progressed so slowly that the new governor (the sixth since de Fondesviela), Luis de las Casas y Aragorri, was not able to occupy the building until 1791, and work was not completed until 1792. The building originally housed the governor's residence and a prison, as well as being used as the meeting place for the city council, as the original council offices in Plaza San Francisco had been badly damaged by a hurricane in 1768. The prison, located in the west wing, was closed in 1834.

The last of the Colonial governors vacated the palace in 1898 when Cuba gained independence under the terms of the Treaty of Paris, and it was used by the US military governors from 1899 until 1902. It was used as the presidential palace of the Cuban Republic from 1902 until 1920, when the president relocated to the building which now houses the Museum of the Revolution and the Palacio de los Capitanes Generales became once again the offices of the city council. The municipal authorities moved elsewhere in 1967 and in 1968 the palace became the City Museum.

== Building ==
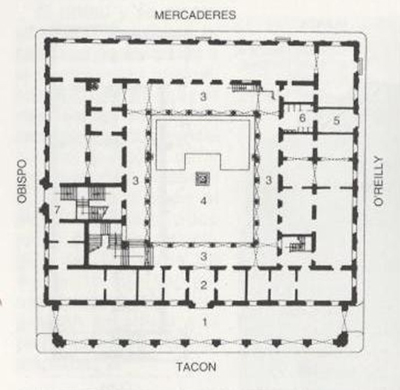
Palacio de los Capitanes Generales. Havana, Cuba_Floor Plan

The building is in the Cuban Baroque style. It is a thick-walled square building, little altered from the time of its original construction. The front of the building has an arcade with arches supported by columns and a pavement made from china pelona. Above the arcade the first storey has a limestone façade created from local limestone, notable for the numerous marine fossils embedded in the stone. Small balconies extend out from the full length stained-glass windows, level with the top of the columns below. In the centre of the building is an open leafy courtyard overlooked by a gallery on all four sides.

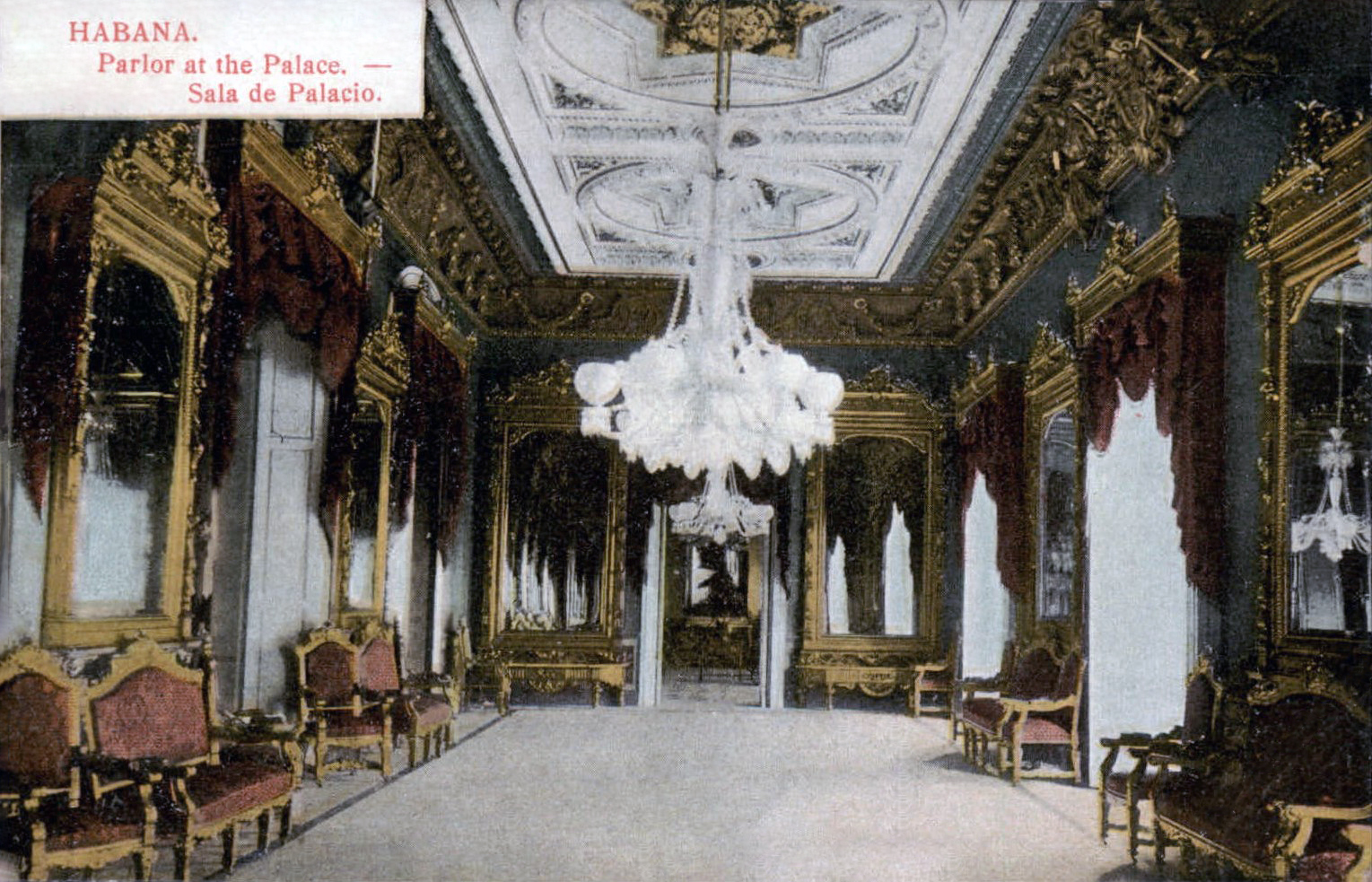
Colonial Hall of the Mirrors, Salón de los Espejos, photo of 1905.

The ground floor and mezzanine contain artwork and artefacts from Havana's past. "La Giradilla", a statue that became the symbol of the city, and was originally located on the tower of the nearby Castillo de la Real Fuerza, stands at the foot of the stairs leading to the mezzanine. The Cenotaph, the oldest colonial monument in Cuba, taken from the original Parroquial Mayor church, is on display in one of the rooms on the lower floor, and another room houses relics from the Espada Cemetery, including the tomb of the French artist Jean Baptiste Vermay.

The Espada Cemetery was the first cemetery in the city, founded by Juan José Diaz de Espada in 1806. Also on display are some of the original stone baths in the shape of a nautilus shell and a 19th-century fire engine manufactured in London. On the top floor the rooms of the governor's residence are preserved with much of the original furniture and decoration. The Hall of Heroic Cuba contains important objects from the wars of independence and many flags of national significance including the flag of Carlos Manuel de Céspedes, the "Father of the Homeland" (Padre de la Patria). The building also houses the Office of the City Historian, headed by Eusebio Leal, which is responsible for the restoration of Old Havana.

== Gallery ==
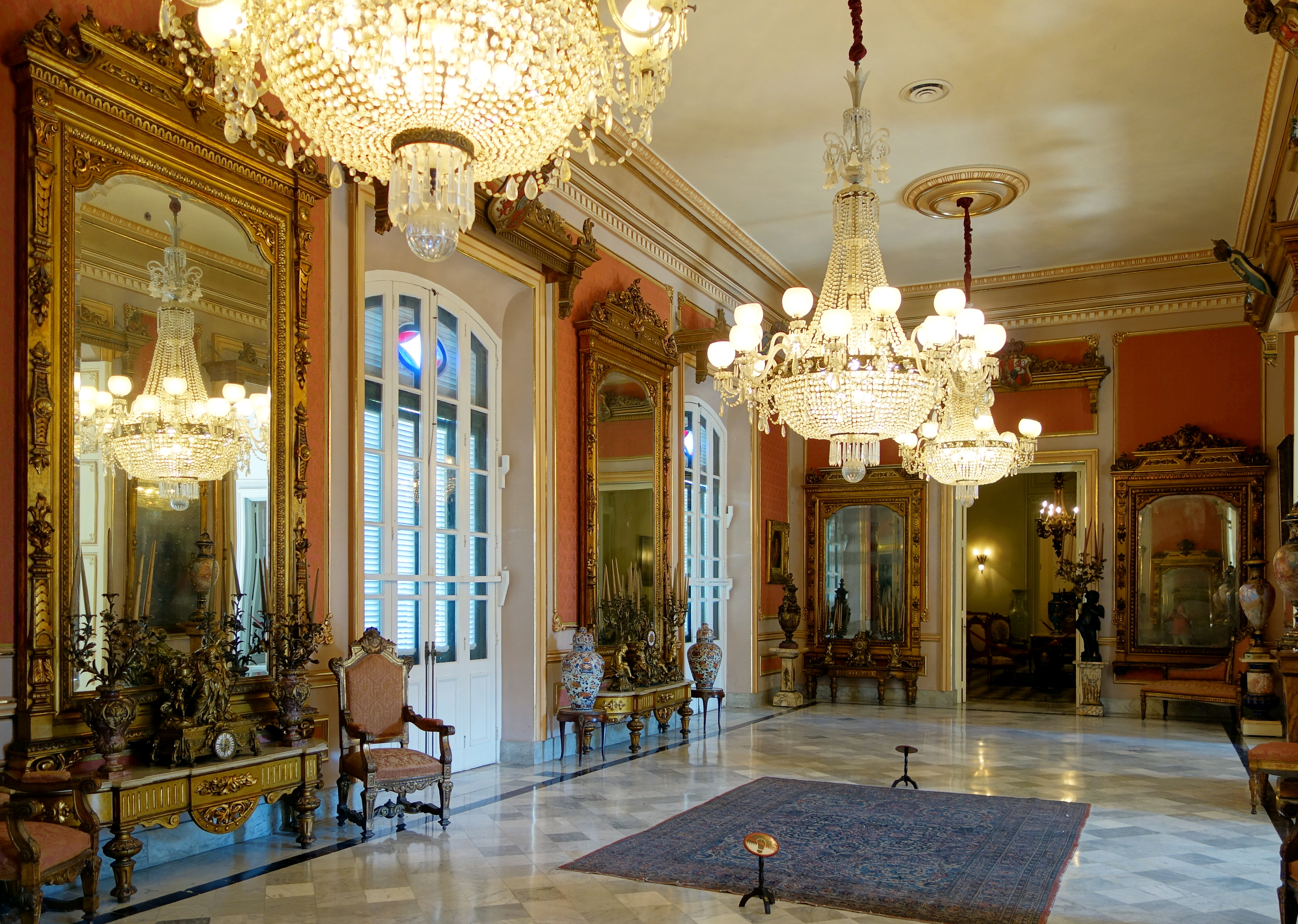

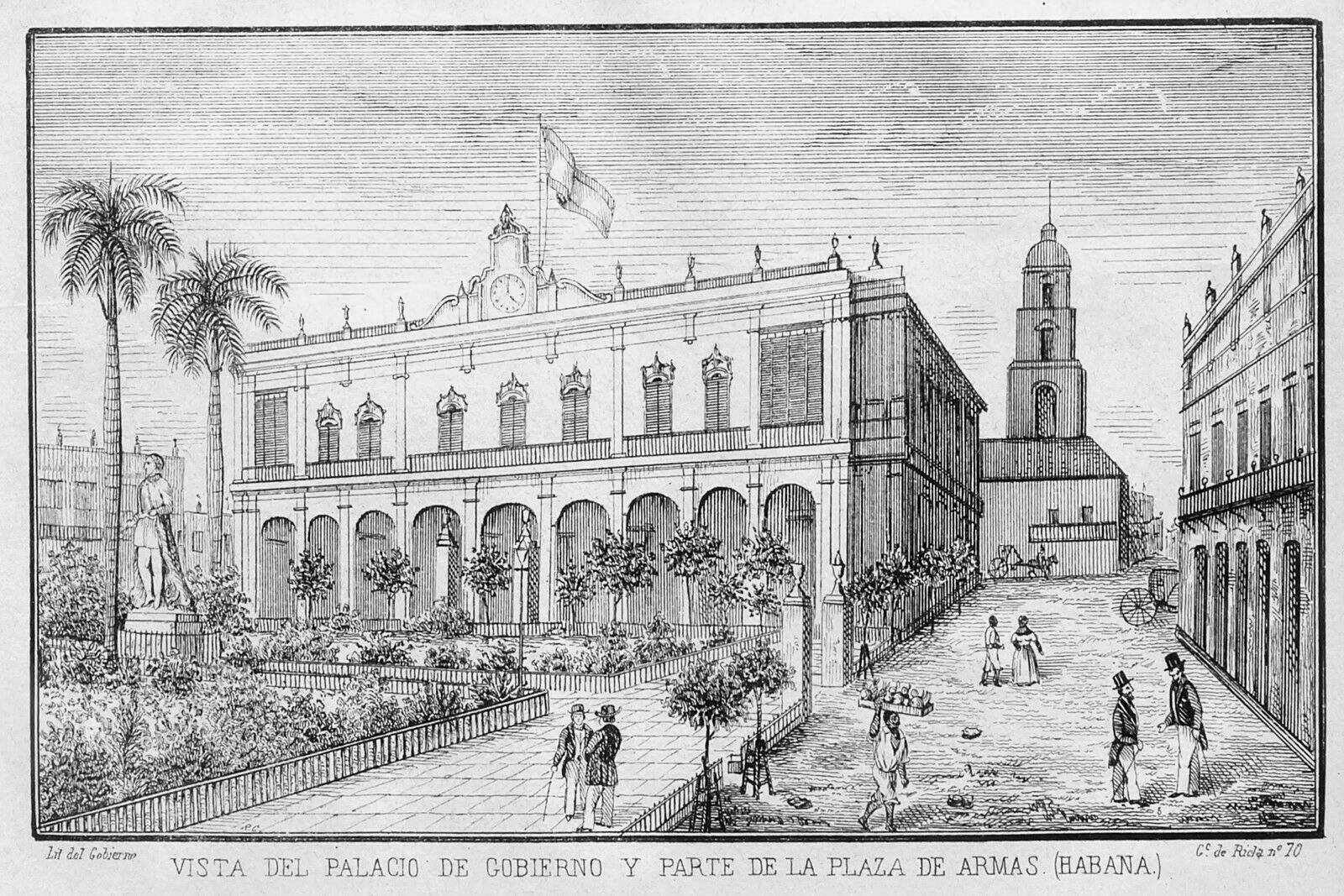
Palace of the General Captains in 1859.

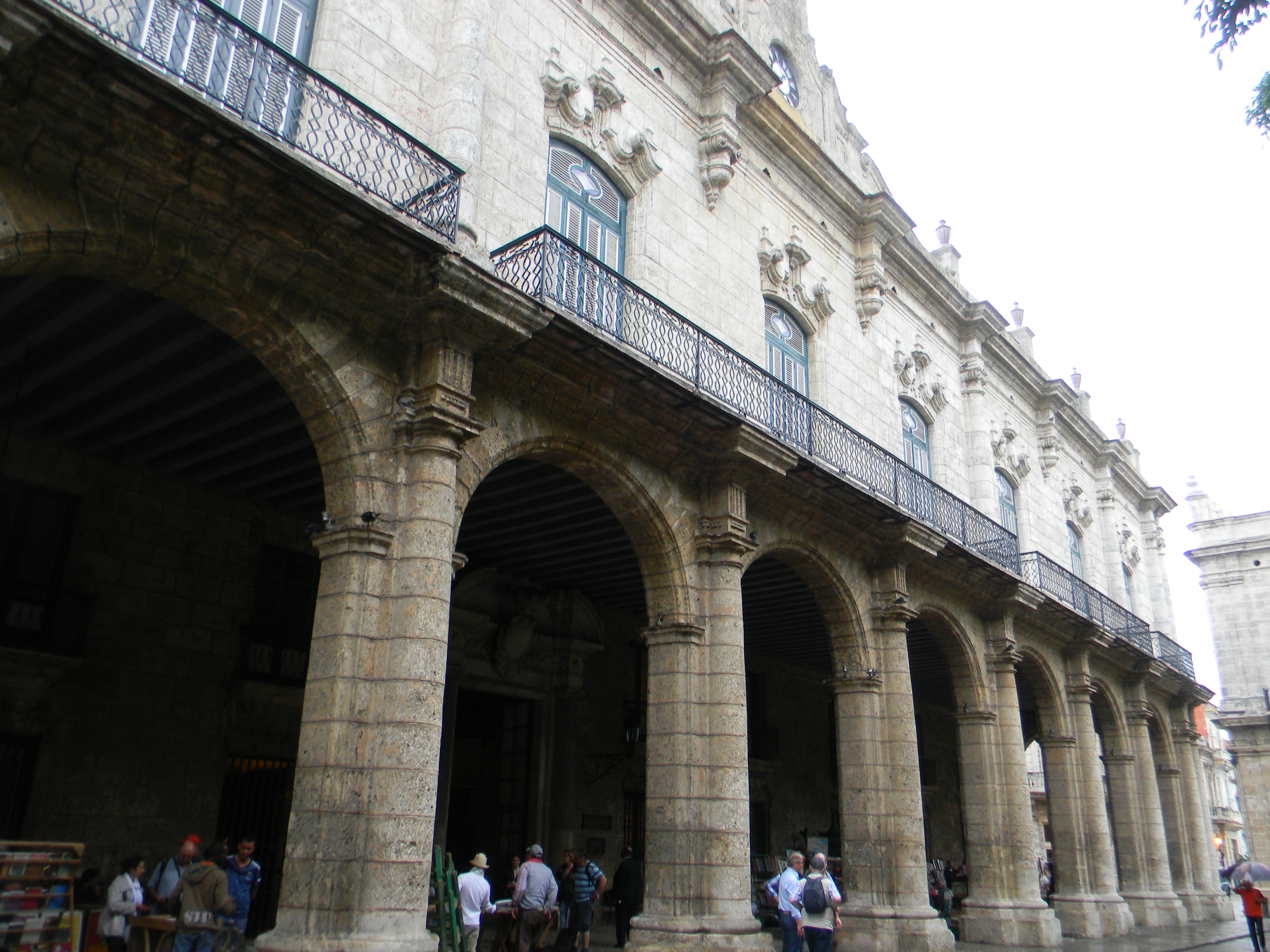

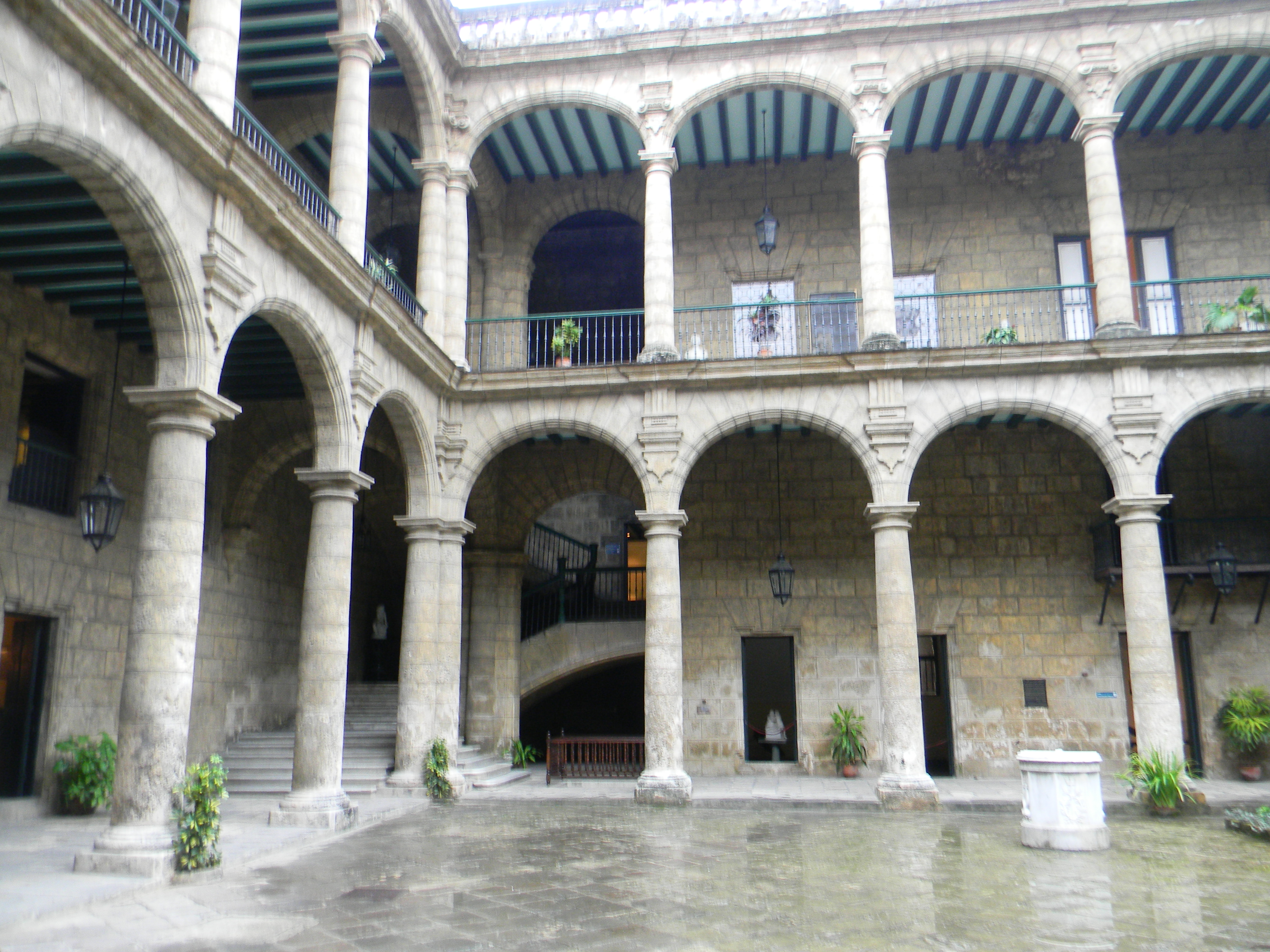
Central courtyard.

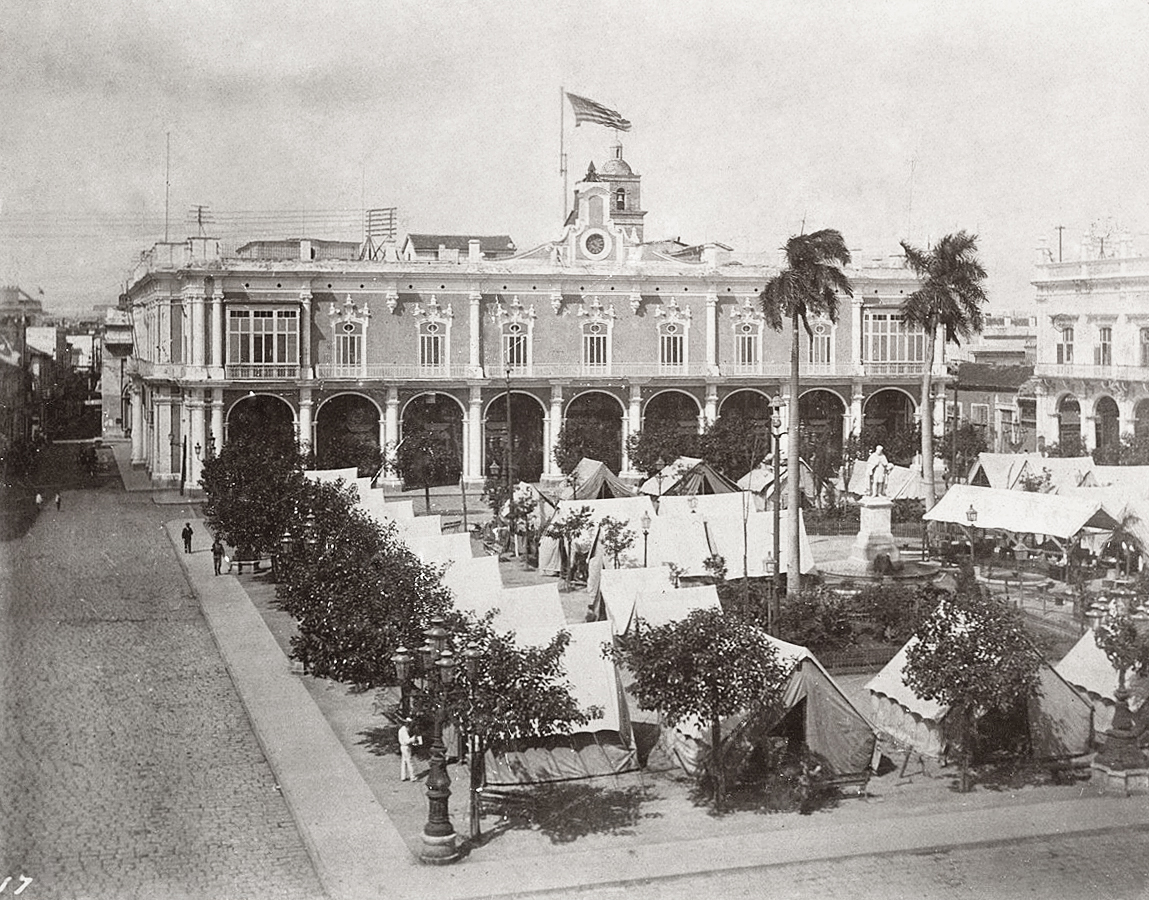
View of Palace and Plaza de Armas in 1898

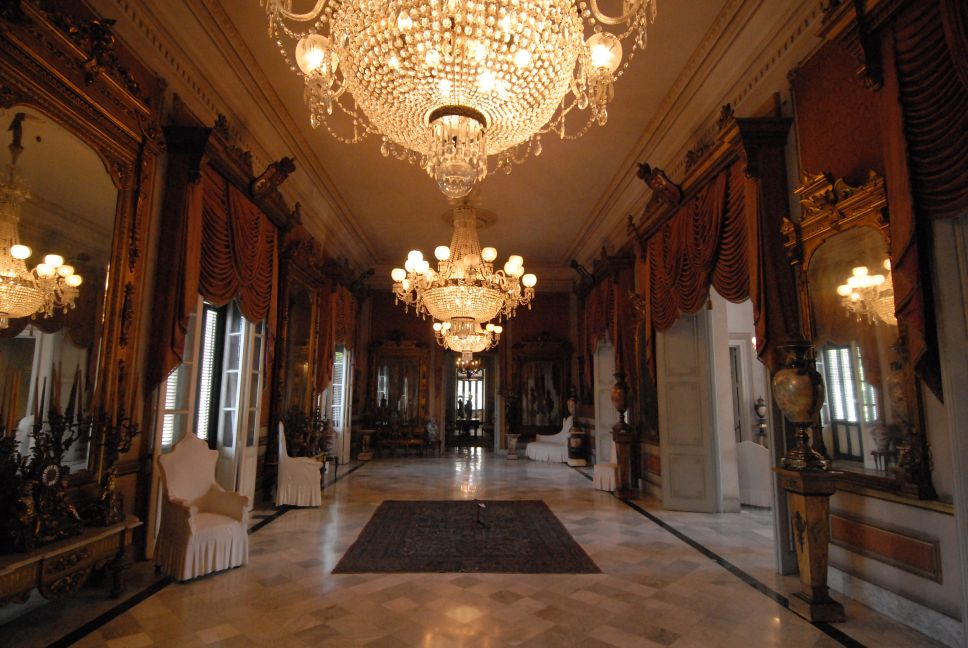
The end of Spanish rule was declared in the Salon de los Espejos in 1899

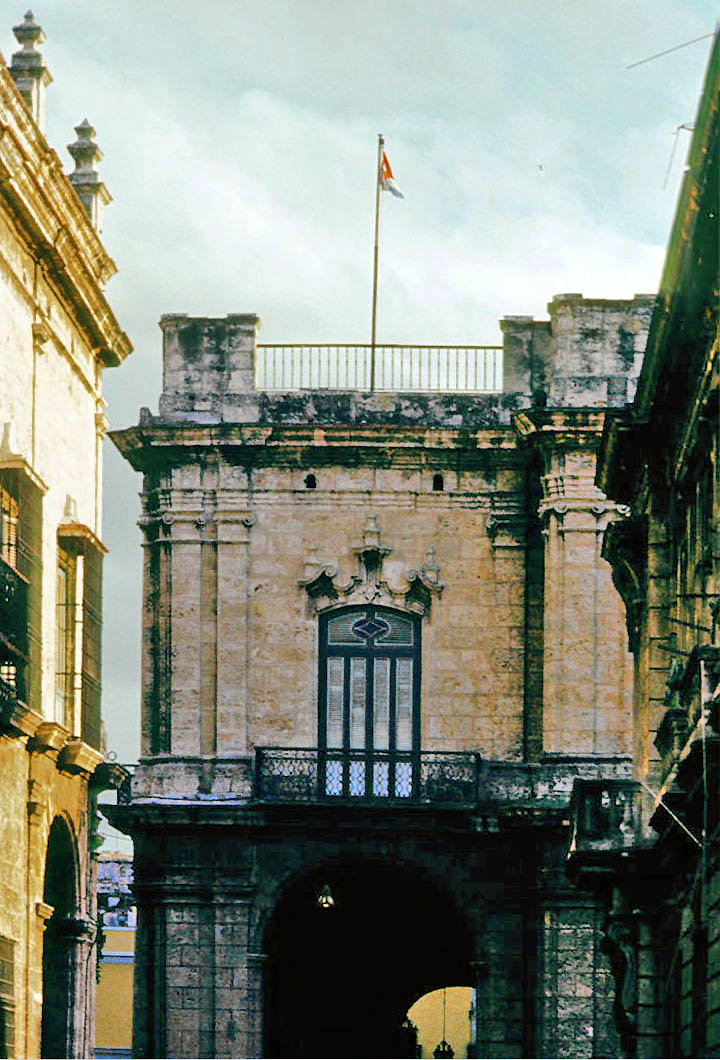
Detail of the palace, photo of 1983

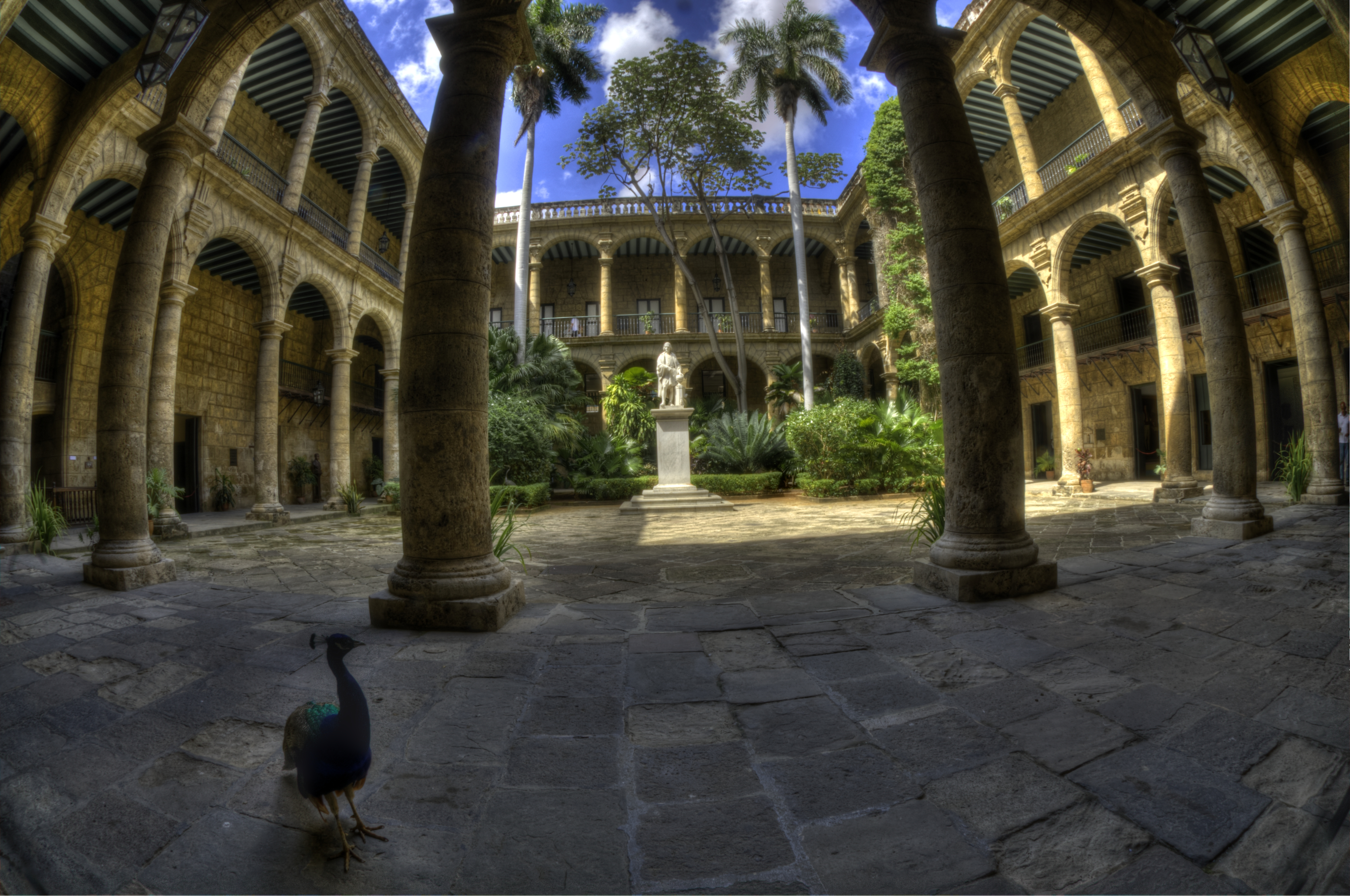
Cloister

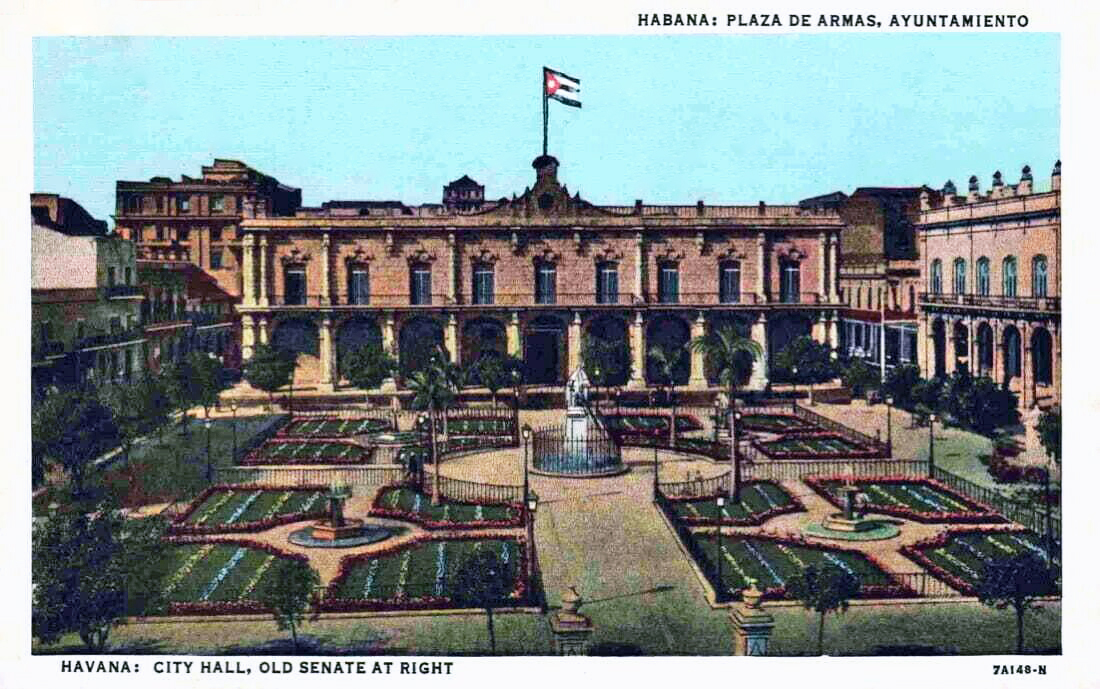
Facade, postcard of 1937

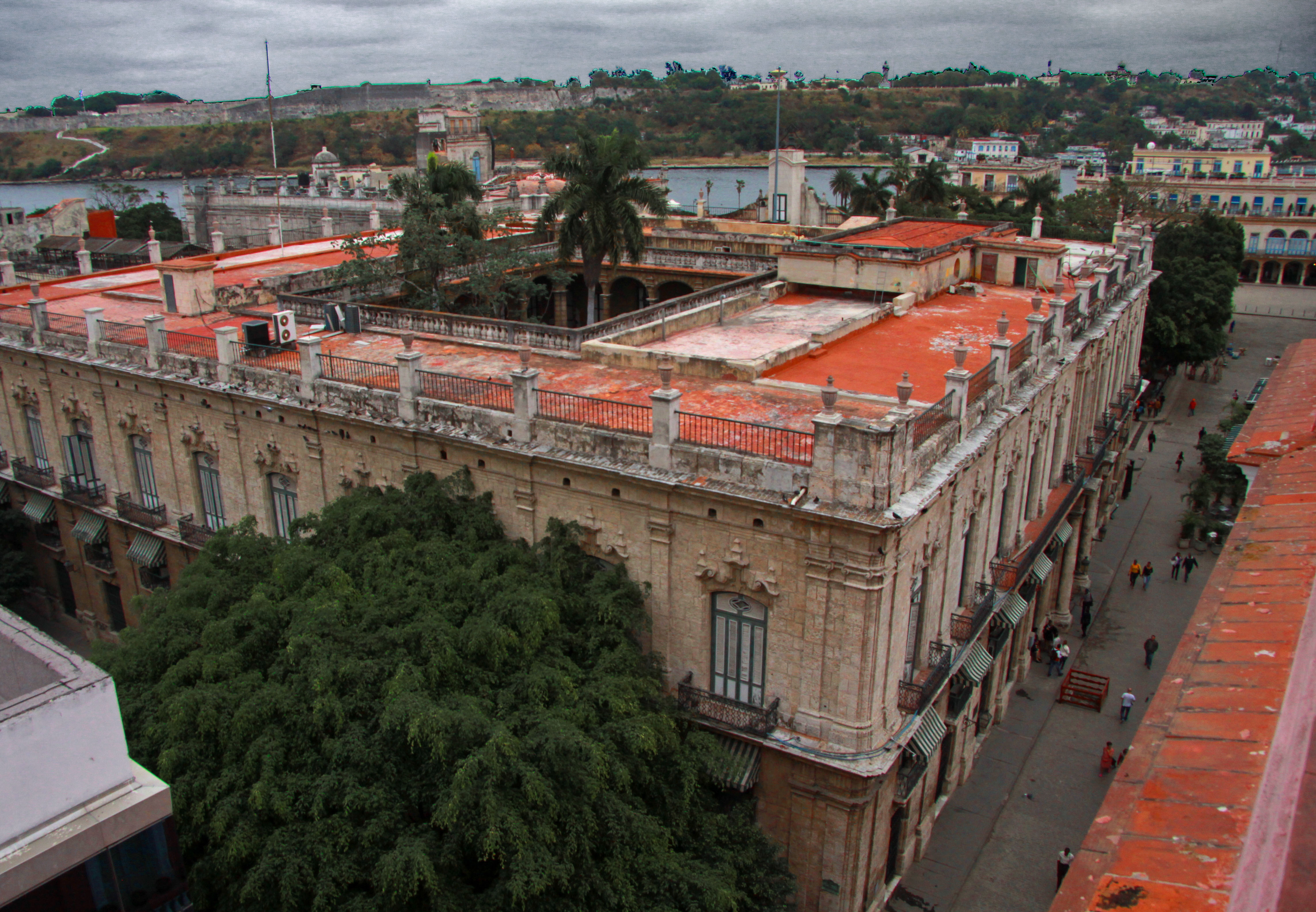
Rear facade

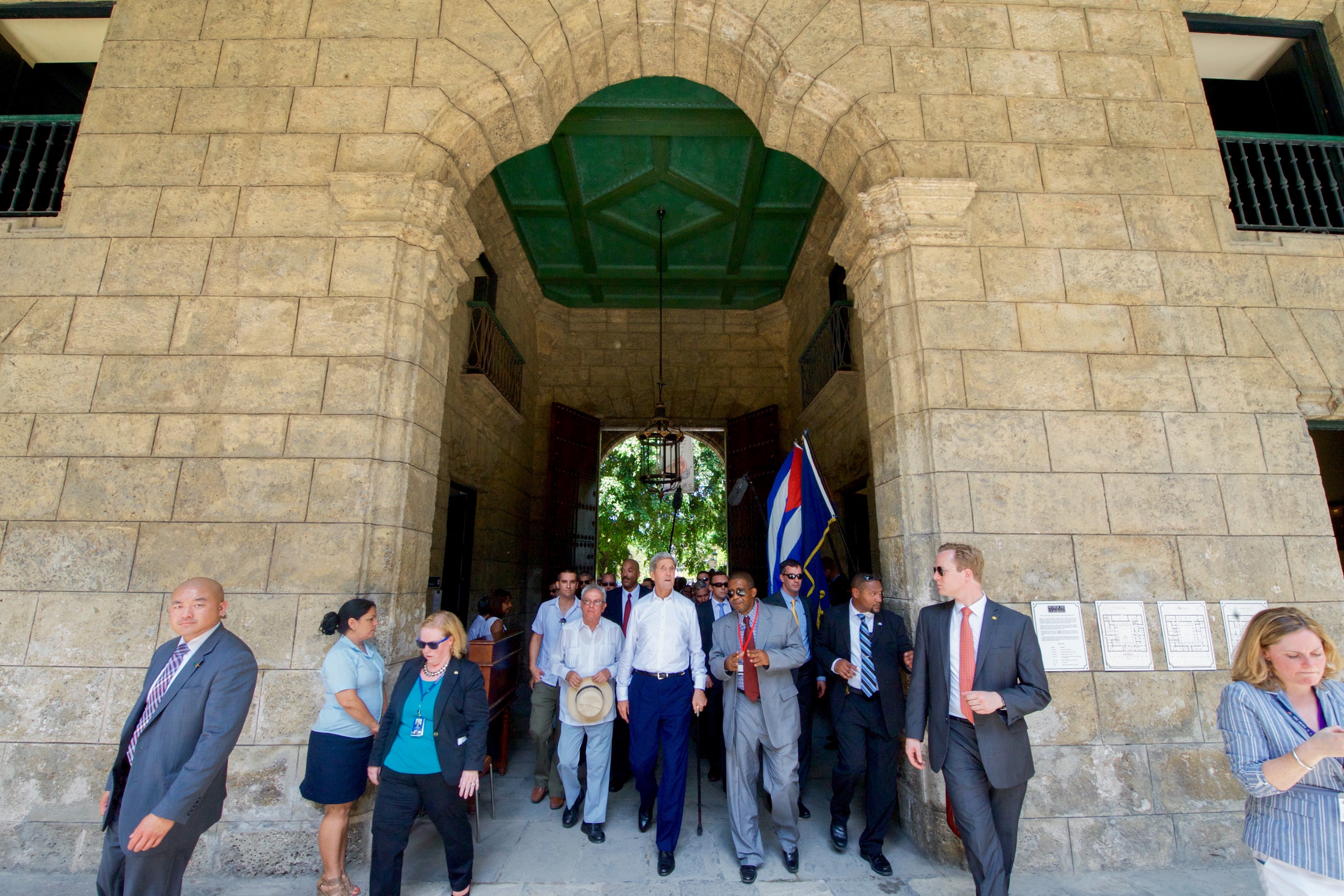
U.S. Secretary of State John Kerry walks through the courtyard of the Palacio de los Capitanes Generales, 2015.

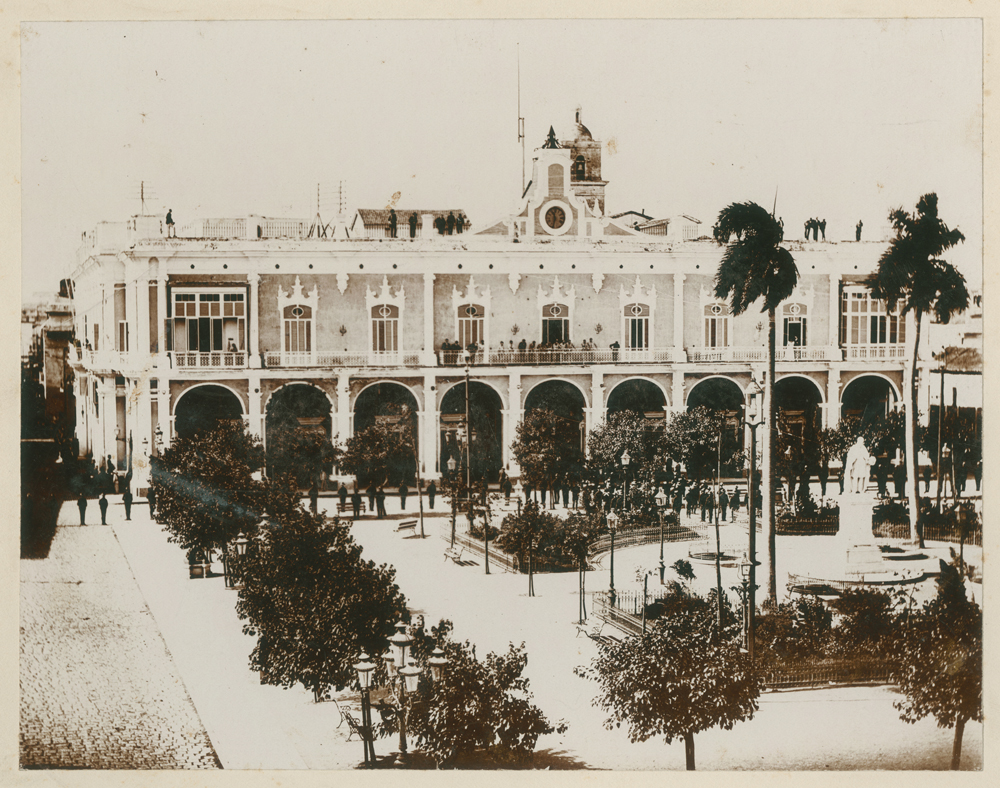
Historical photo showing the Governor-General's Palace, Havana Cuba, just before surrender and raising of American colors 11:30 a.m., January 1, 1899. SMU Libraries.

== See also ==
- List of buildings in Havana
- Palacio del Segundo Cabo
- El Templete
- Lonja del Comercio building
- Antonio Fernández de Trebejos y Zaldívar
- Coliseo of Havana
- Paseo de Tacón
- Iglesia de San Francisco de Paula, Havana
- Palacio del Segundo Cabo
- Cuartel de Milicias, Havana
