= Didone abbandonata (Jommelli) =

Didone abbandonata is an opera in three acts by Niccolò Jommelli of the libretto Didone abbandonata by Pietro Metastasio. It was composed just after Jommelli left Venice in 1746 and revised in 1763. It was first performed on January 28, 1747, at the Teatro Argentina in Rome.

== Recordings ==
- Didone abbandonata [3rd version] (1995). Martina Borst (Enea), Arno Raunig (Osmida), William Kendall (Iarba), Mechthild Bach (Selene), Dorothea Röschmann (Didone), Daniel Taylor (Araspe). Stuttgarter Kammerorchester, Frieder Bernius. Orfeo.
