= Dido Fontana =

Italian photographer

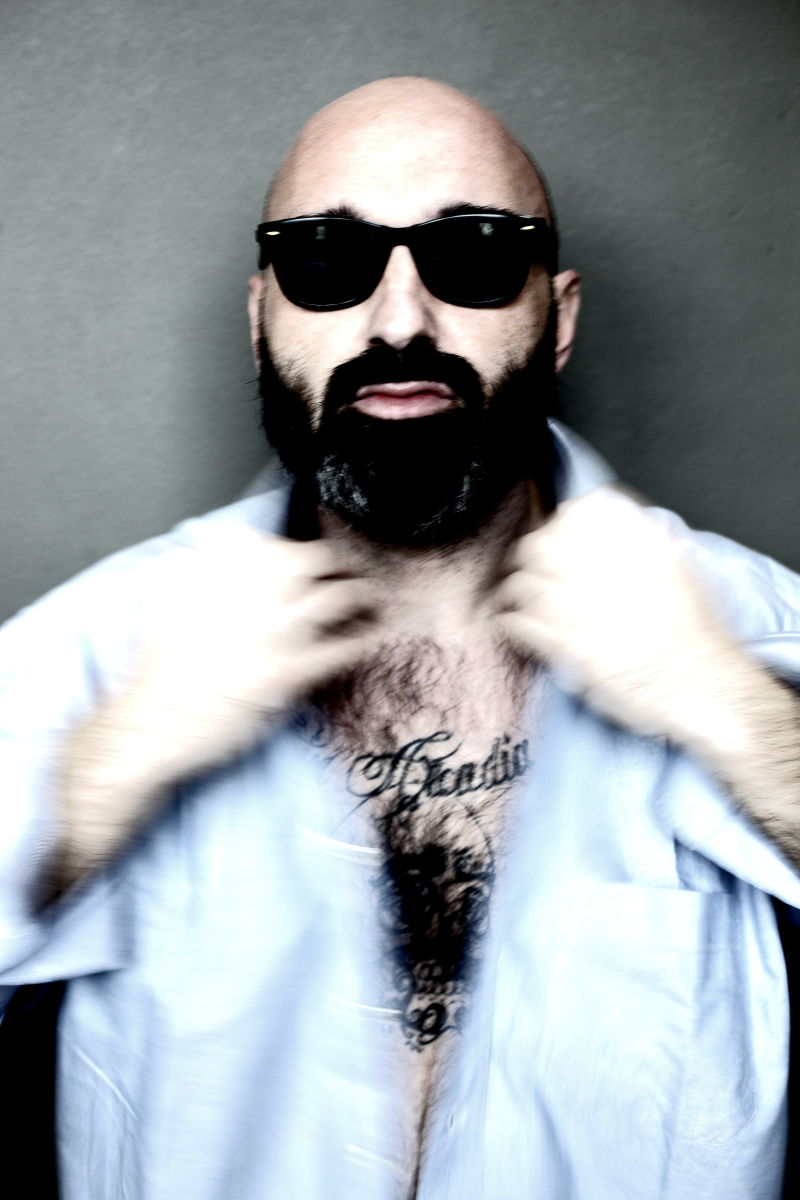
- Dido Fontana
- Known for: Photography

Dido Fontana is an Italian photographer.

== Life and work ==
Fontana was born in Mezzolombardo, Trentino-Alto Adige/Südtirol in the north of Italy, and spent much of his childhood in his father's darkroom.

His work might appear spontaneous; however, every detail is carefully planned.

Fontana's photographs have been featured in magazines and web zines such as Ginza, Playboy, and Tissue. In 2014, one of his photos was exhibited at the Minneapolis Institute of Arts show The Art of Murder.

== Books ==
- Didocentrico. Self-published/Blurb, 2010.
- Perverdido
- The Personal Trainer 3. Edition of 200 copies.
- The Personal Trainer 4. Edition of 200 copies.
- The Personal Trainer 5. Edition of 200 copies with Golab Agency-Milano, 2019.
