= Dido (disambiguation) =

Dido was founder and first queen of Carthage.

Dido or DIDO may also refer to:

== Arts ==
- Dido, Queen of Carthage (play), a play by Christopher Marlowe
- Dido and Aeneas, an opera by Henry Purcell
- Dido, Queen of Carthage (opera), an opera by Stephen Storace
- Dido (Fuseli), a painting by Henry Fuseli
- "Dido", a song on Café del Mar Aria
- Fido Dido, a cartoon character

== People ==
- Dido (singer), a British singer-songwriter
- Dido Ali, Kenyan politician
- Dido Elizabeth Belle, daughter of John Lindsay
- Dido Fontana, an Italian photographer
- Dido (footballer), a Brazilian footballer
- Dido Harding, Baroness Harding of Winscombe
- Dido Miles, an English actress
- E.K.M. Dido, a South African writer

== Transport ==
- HMS Dido, the name of seven British Royal Navy vessels
- Dido (train) a train, typically for railway staff, provided on a Day in, day out basis

== Other ==
- The Tsez people, or Dido, are an indigenous people of the North Caucasus
- The Tsez language, or Dido, the language of the Tsez people
- DIDO (nuclear reactor), a nuclear reactor at the Atomic Energy Research Establishment
- DIDO (software), software for solving optimal control problems
- 209 Dido, a very large main-belt asteroid
- DIDO (network), "distributed input distributed output" wireless network technology
- Dido, Texas, a ghost town in Tarrant County, Texas
- Dido's problem, the isoperimetric problem in mathematics
