= Didone abbandonata =

Opera libretto by Pietro Metastasio

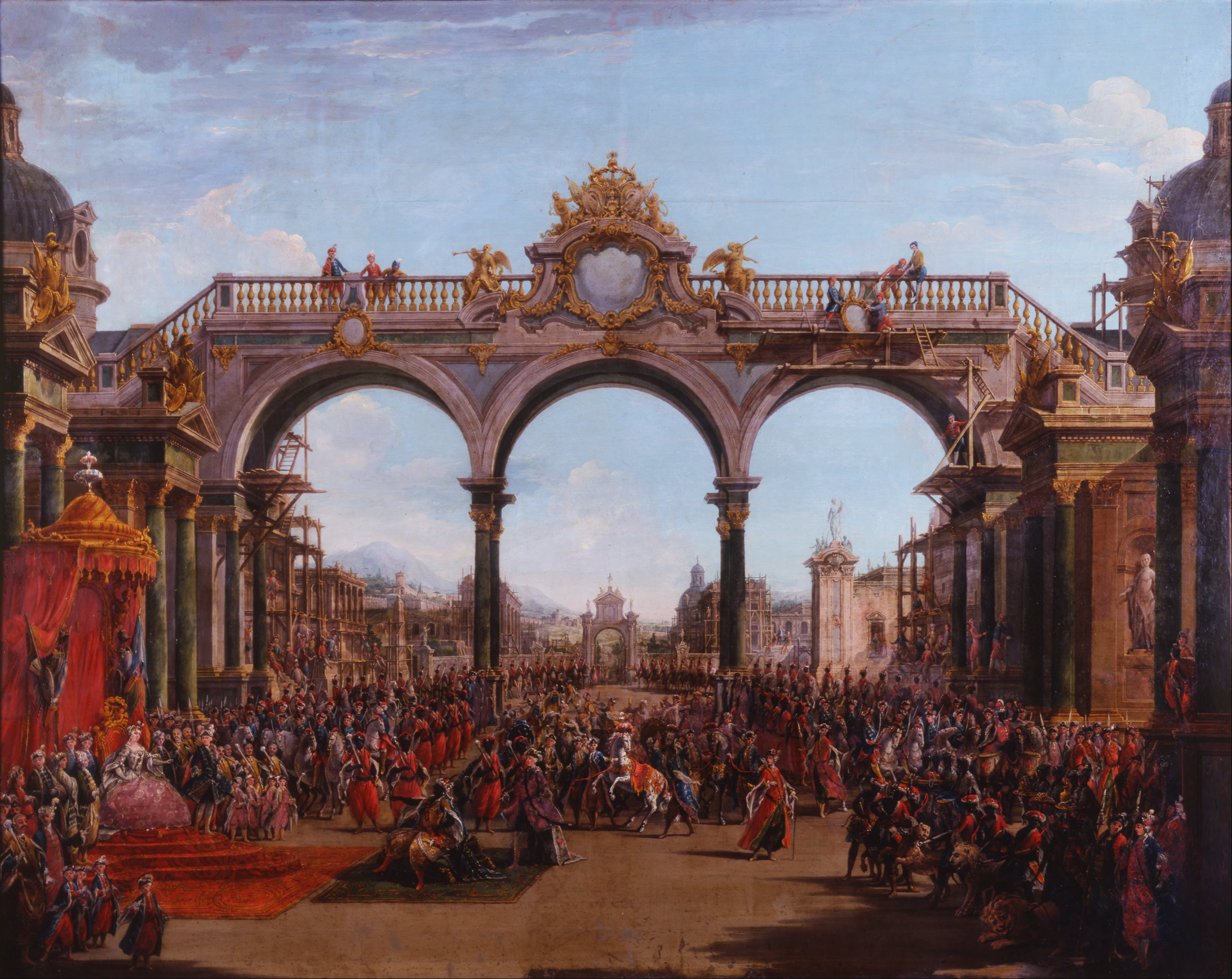
Didone abbandonata, act 1, scene 5; Francesco Battaglioli (1754)

Didone abbandonata is an opera libretto in three acts by Pietro Metastasio. It was his first original work and was set to music by Domenico Sarro in 1724. The opera was accompanied by the intermezzo L'impresario delle Isole Canarie, also by Metastasio.

During the century that followed, it was set more than 50 times by other composers such as Nicola Porpora (1725), Leonardo Vinci (1726), Baldassare Galuppi (1740), Johann Adolph Hasse (1742), Niccolò Jommelli (1747), Tommaso Traetta (1757), Giuseppe Sarti (1762), Niccolò Piccinni (1770), Saverio Mercadante (1823).
