= Church of San Francisco de Paula, Havana =

Iglesia de San Francisco de Paula, Havana
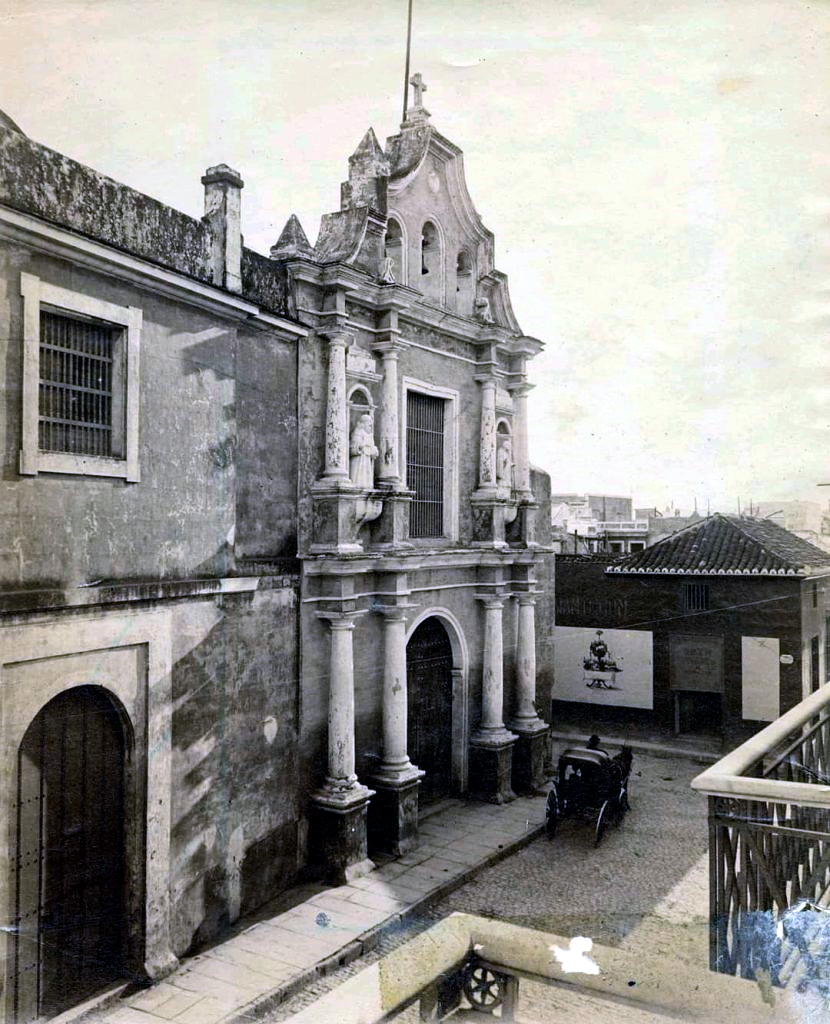
- Iglesia de San Francisco de Paula and Hospital, 1905
- Interactive map of the Iglesia de San Francisco de Paula, Havana area

General information
- Type: Religious
- Architectural style: Baroque
- Location: 110 Leonor Pérez, Havana, Cuba
- Coordinates: 23°07′52″N 82°20′56″W
- Groundbreaking: 1664
- Construction started: 1731
- Renovated: 1760

Technical details
- Structural system: Load bearing
- Material: Masonry

The Iglesia de San Francisco de Paula, Havana is part of the ecclesiastical heritage of Havana. It is located at 110 Calle Leonor Pérez on the corner of Calle San Ignacio. It is near the bay on the south side of Havana Vieja."

== History ==
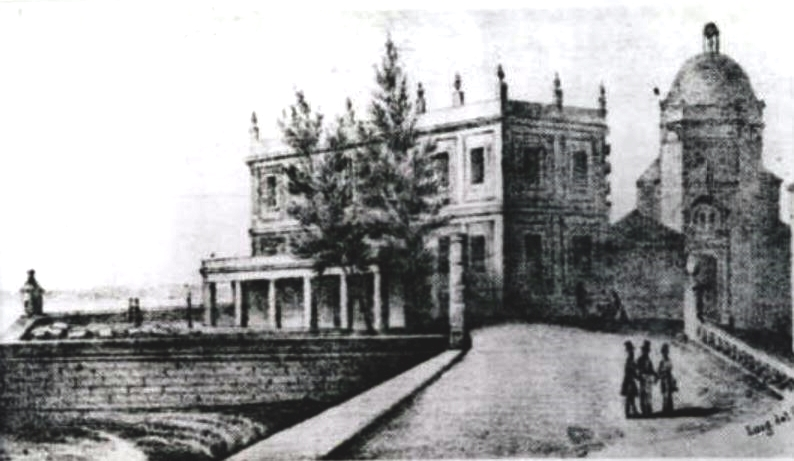
Hospital and Iglesia San Francisco de Paula from La Alameda. Havana, Cuba.1776.

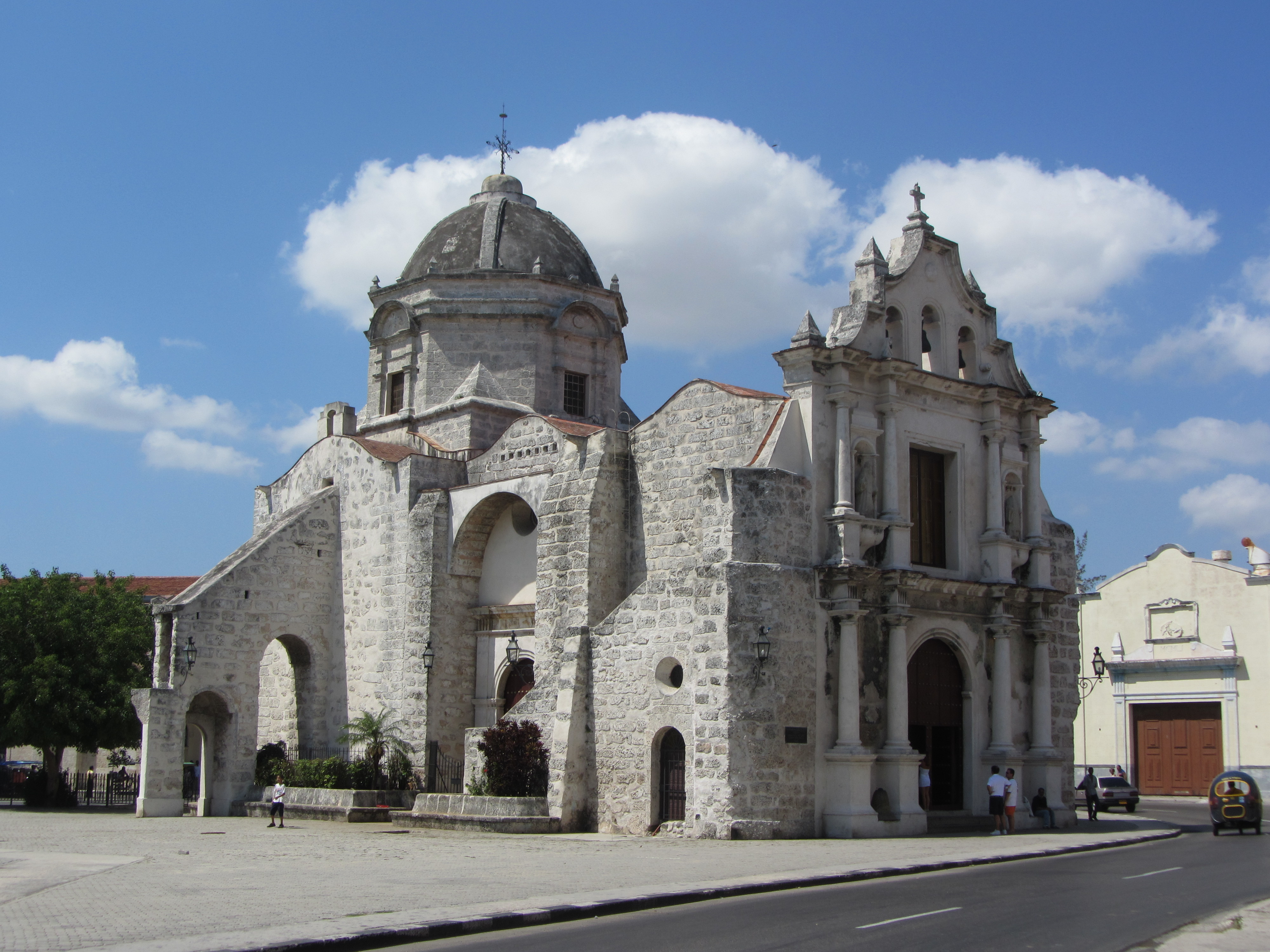
Facade of the Iglesia de San Francisco de Paula, 2011.

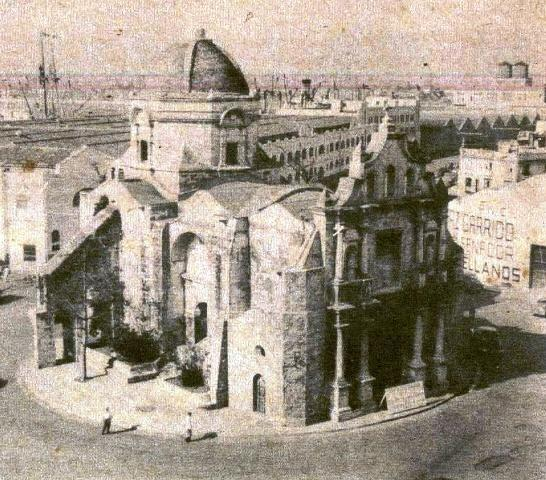
Iglesia de San Francisco de Paula in 1945.

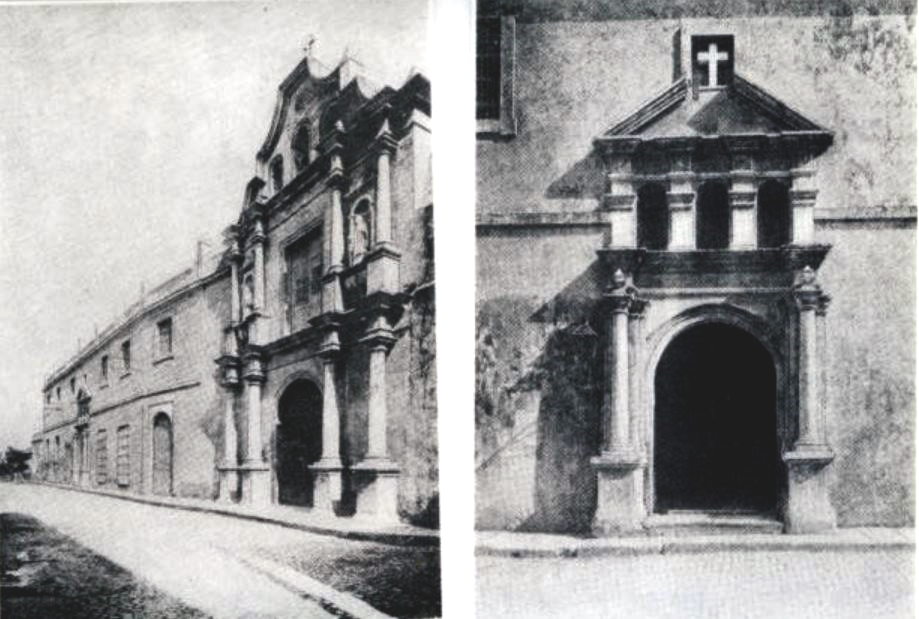
Hospital and Iglesia San Francisco de Paula in 1900.

Towards the end of the 17th century, the first stone of what would be the hospital for women and the church of San Francisco de Paula was placed, the buildings were expanded in 1731 with the support and donations from the City Council and orders of the different General Captains in command of the island. In 1776, it was the most important hospital in Havana, there were several generations of famous doctors that trained here.

== Building ==
The Presbyter of the Cathedral of Havana, don Nicolás Estévez Borges, in 1664 ordered the construction of a Hospital for Women and an adjoining church devoted to Saint Francis of Paola who was one of the founders of the Roman Catholic Order of the Minims. (Note: The San Francisco de Paula Hospital for women began its functions in 1672, welcoming, in crowded conditions most of the time, black and white mentally ill patients. The gloomy aspect of the construction and the screams of the sick women made this place a well-known place in the area, but not for the reasons why hospitals like to be known, but as a gloomy reference. In the great 19th century Creole novel, Cecilia Valdés by Cirilo Villaverde, the church-hospital is evoked several times because, supposedly, Cecilia's mother was confined there when she lost the use of her mental faculties after the troubles and vicissitudes of her love affair with Don Cándido Gamboa.) San Francisco de Paula (1416-1507) was a hermit, famous for his humility and his miracles. His party is celebrated on April 2.

Both buildings were completely destroyed by a hurricane in 1730 and were rebuilt and enlarged in 1745 in the Baroque style we see today, resulting in the Royal Hospital of Havana and the Church of San Francisco de Paula.

=== National monument ===
The Havana Central Railroad, a U. S. company, in 1907 attempted to acquire the temple for its own corporate use. The Central Railroad's several attempts to acquire and eventually demolish the church were frustrated by the opposition of historian Emilio Roig de Leuchsenring and anthropologist don Fernando Ortiz. Their efforts not only stopped the demolition of the church but also got it listed as National Monument in 1944. Havana Central Railroads, however, was able to bring down the hospital upon approval from the relevant authorities at the time.

An example of the pre-Churrigueresque Baroque style, the floor plan of the Iglesia de San Francisco de Paula is typologically similar to the Iglesia de San Francisco de Asís as both ground plans are based on a Latin cross. The façade has a central arched doorway and columns at the sides, typical of Spanish churches. There is a belfry in the front, but the 3 bells were never recovered after the hurricane of 1730. The Office of the City Historian restored the stained glass windows.

== Restoration ==
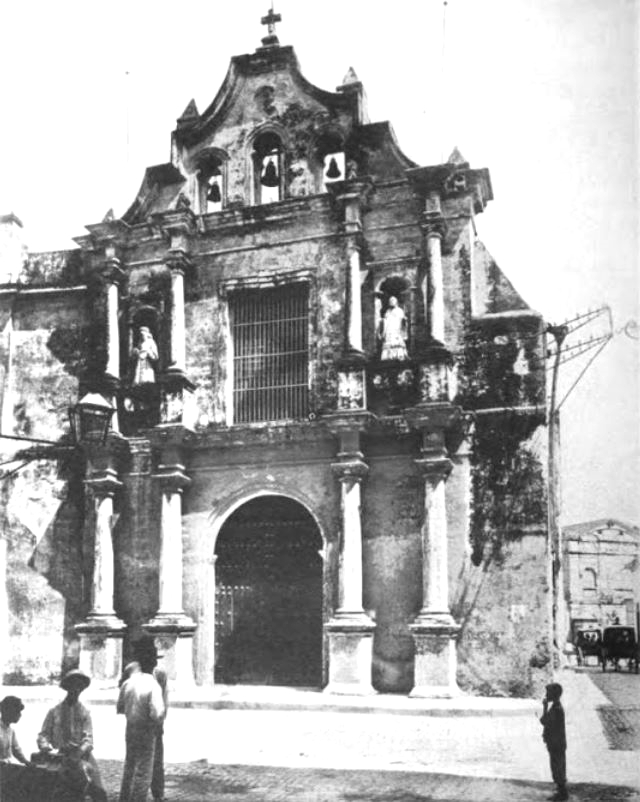
Church San Francisco de Paula in 1905

The Iglesia de San Francisco de Paula is a representative example of the Cuban Baroque of the first half of the 18th century. The portion of the church that still exists, the octagonal base of the dome, the façade, and the stained glass windows, all part of the original building of 1745, have all been restored. The facade is similar to that of the church of Santo Domingo, in Guanabacoa and the convent of San Francisco de Asís, built on a similar date. The nave has a barrel vault with a dome that marks the crossing. As an altarpiece, it has a stained glass window. It has the only organ that has been preserved in Cuba with its original pipe and machinery in its original location. The church contains the ashes of the Cuban violinist Claudio Brindis de Salas Garrido (1852-1911), considered one of the best violinists of his time.

== La Alameda de Paula ==
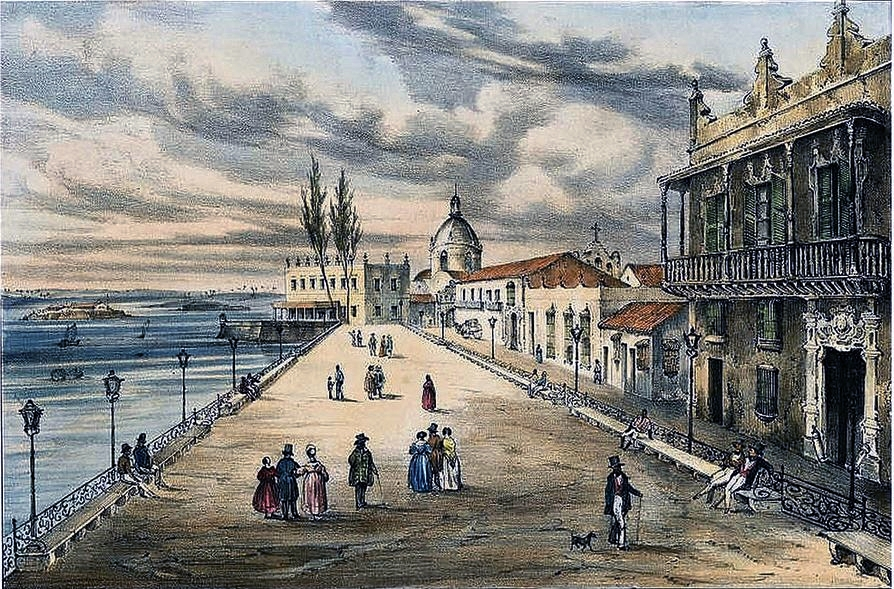
Frédéric Mialhe: Álbum pintoresco de la Isla de Cuba. Showing Alameda de Paula with the Hospital and Iglesia de San Francisco de Paula in 1840.

The Alameda de Paula was the first promenade in Cuba, designed and constructed in 1776 by Antonio Fernández de Trebejos y Zaldívar, following the instructions of the Laureano de Torres y Ayala, it was created on the site of the old Rincón refuse dump. It was an embankment with two rows of poplar trees and some benches, it became one of Havana's most important social and cultural spaces, it was the model of the Paseo del Prado designed in 1925. It was given the name Alameda de Paula because of its proximity to the old Hospital and Iglesia of San Francisco de Paula. Between 1803 and 1805 the pavement was tiled, a fountain and stone benches, lampposts and the marble column were added, it qualified as a pleasant entertainment for the residents of the Villa de San Cristóbal, lacking recreational sites at that time.

In 1841, the stairs that gave access to the promenade were widened and several lampposts were added. In the year 2000, the Havana promenade was restored and extended until it reached the Iglesia de San Francisco de Paula.

== Coliseo of Havana ==
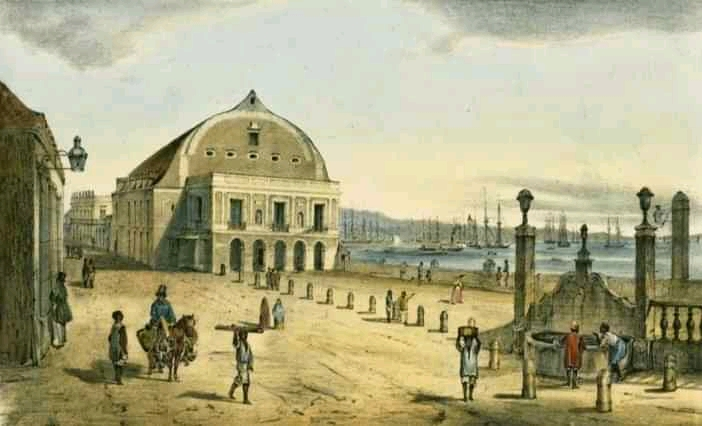
El Coliseo o Teatro Principal de La Habana, painting of 1775.

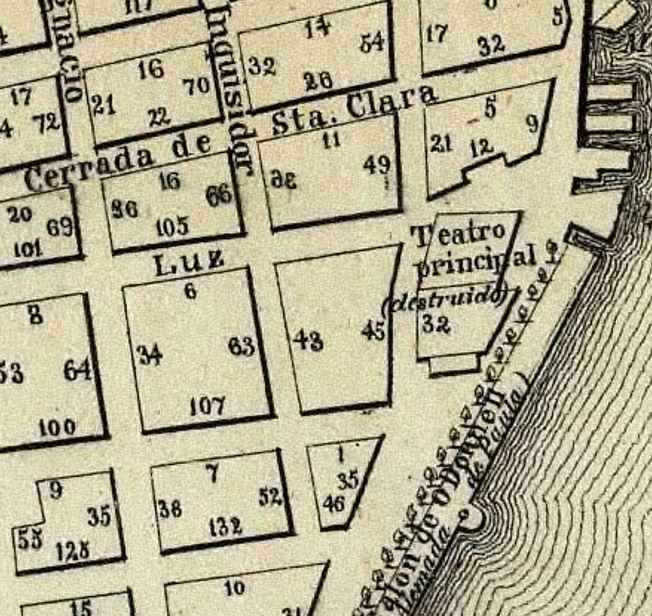
Partial 1853 Havana map Coliseo of Havana.

The Coliseum was the first building erected in Havana to provide theatrical performances, it opened its doors on January 20, 1775. It was located in front of the Alameda de Paula between Calles Acosta, Oficios, and Luz, in Old Havana. Built between 1773 and 1775, the initiative for the creation of the theater came from the Marquis de la Torre, who managed to gather on July 2, 1773, the most important merchants and the main personalities of the city with the aim of raising funds for the construction of the building. Shortly after, work began on the masonry and wood building, directed by the Havana architect Antonio Fernández de Trebejos y Zaldívar; in the year 1775, it was announced that on the 20th of that current month, the performance of comedies would begin in the new Coliseum.

== Gallery ==
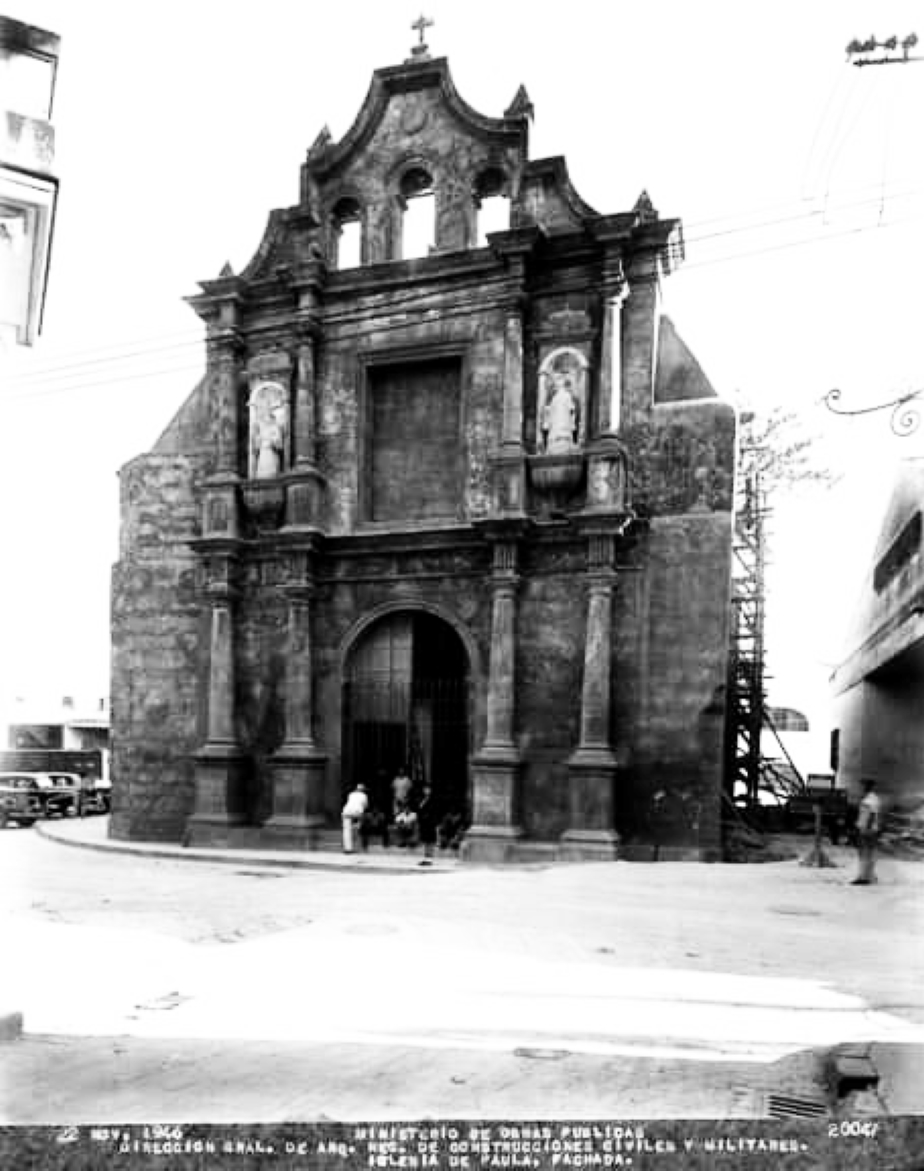

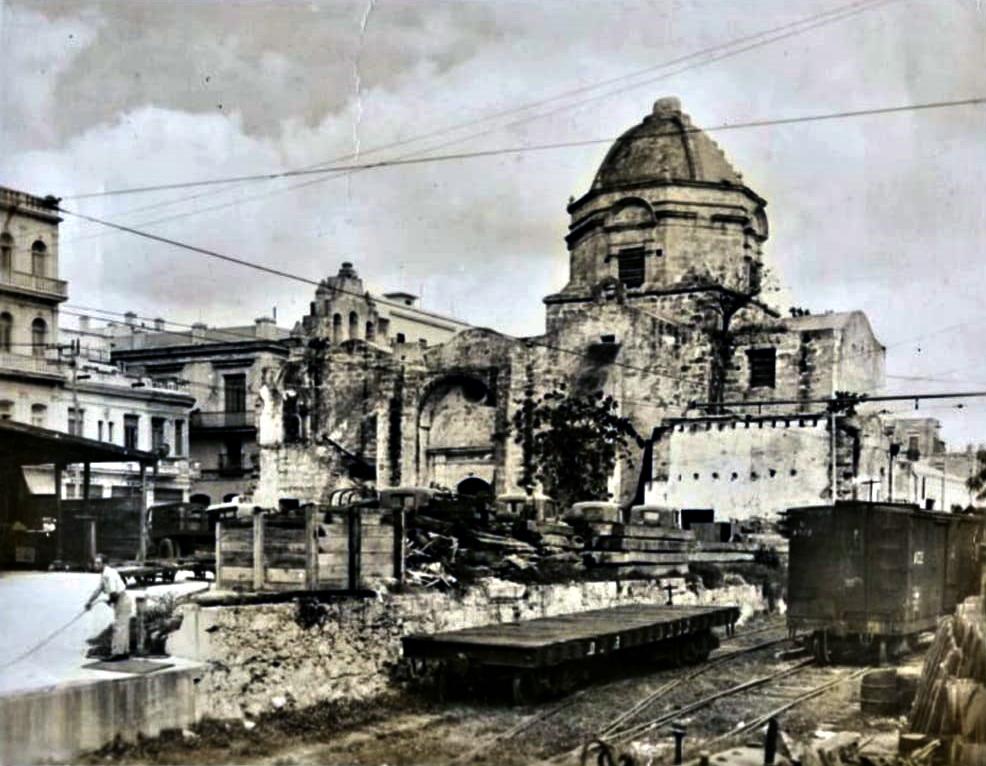
Ministerio de Obras Públicas, Taller fotográfico_2 March, 1946

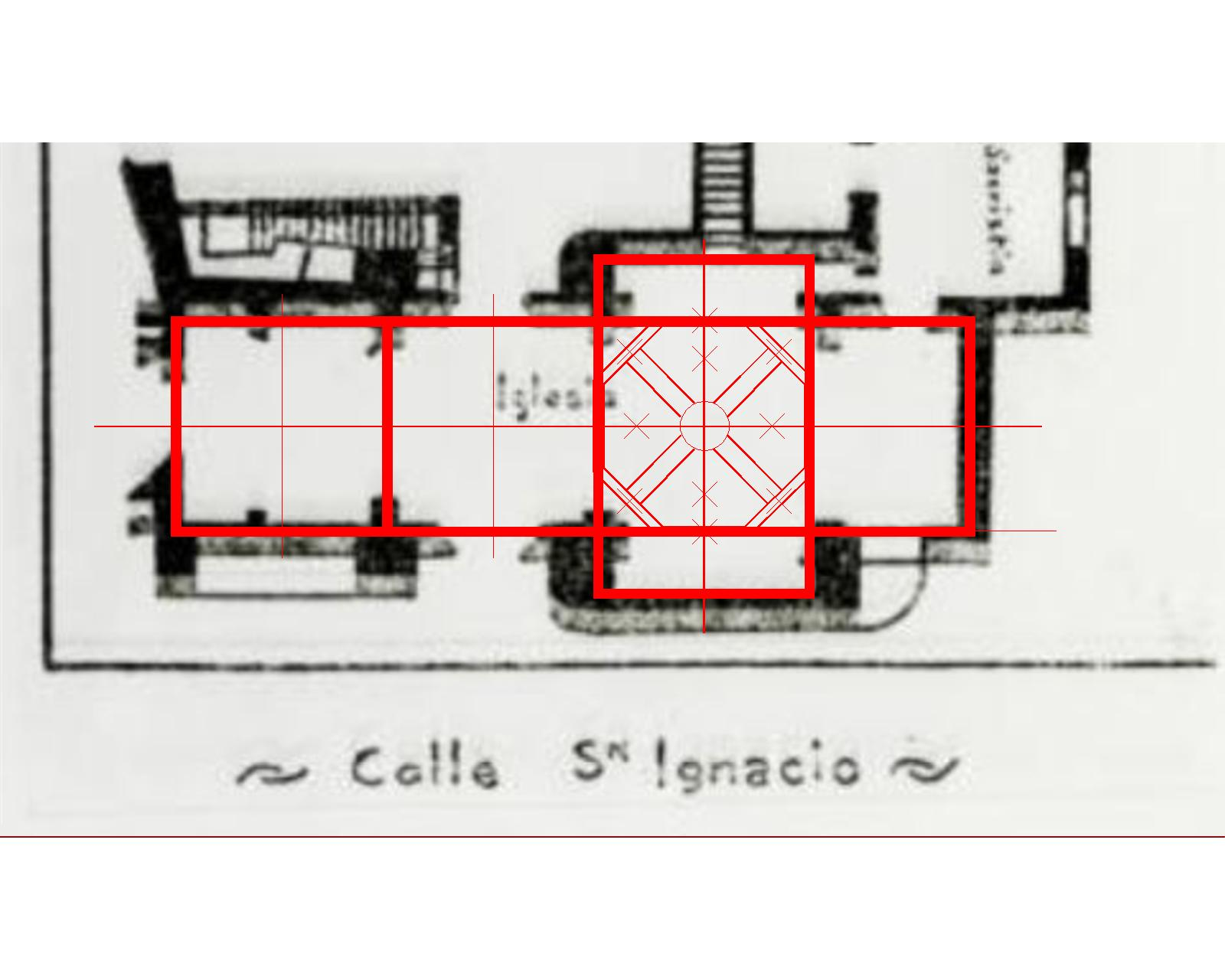
Iglesia de San Francisco de Paula: Structural Bays.

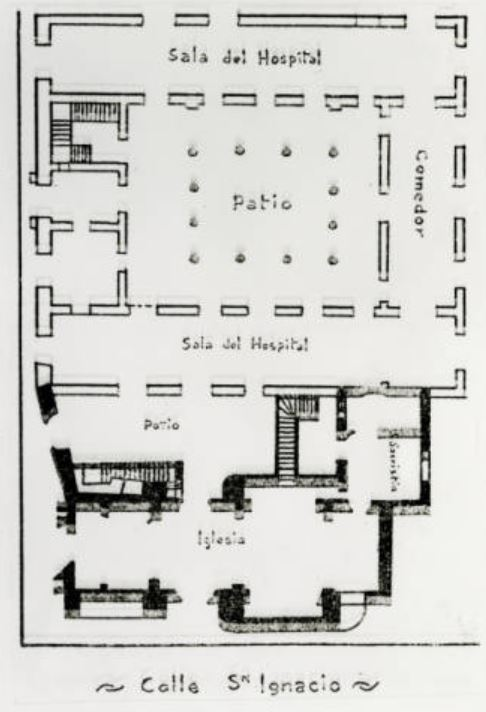
Hospital and Iglesia San Francisco de Paula follow the curve of Calle Leonor Pérez.

== See also ==
- List of buildings in Havana
- La Alameda de Paula, Havana
- Paseo del Prado, Havana
- Basílica Menor de San Francisco de Asís
- Cecilia Valdés
