= El Templete =

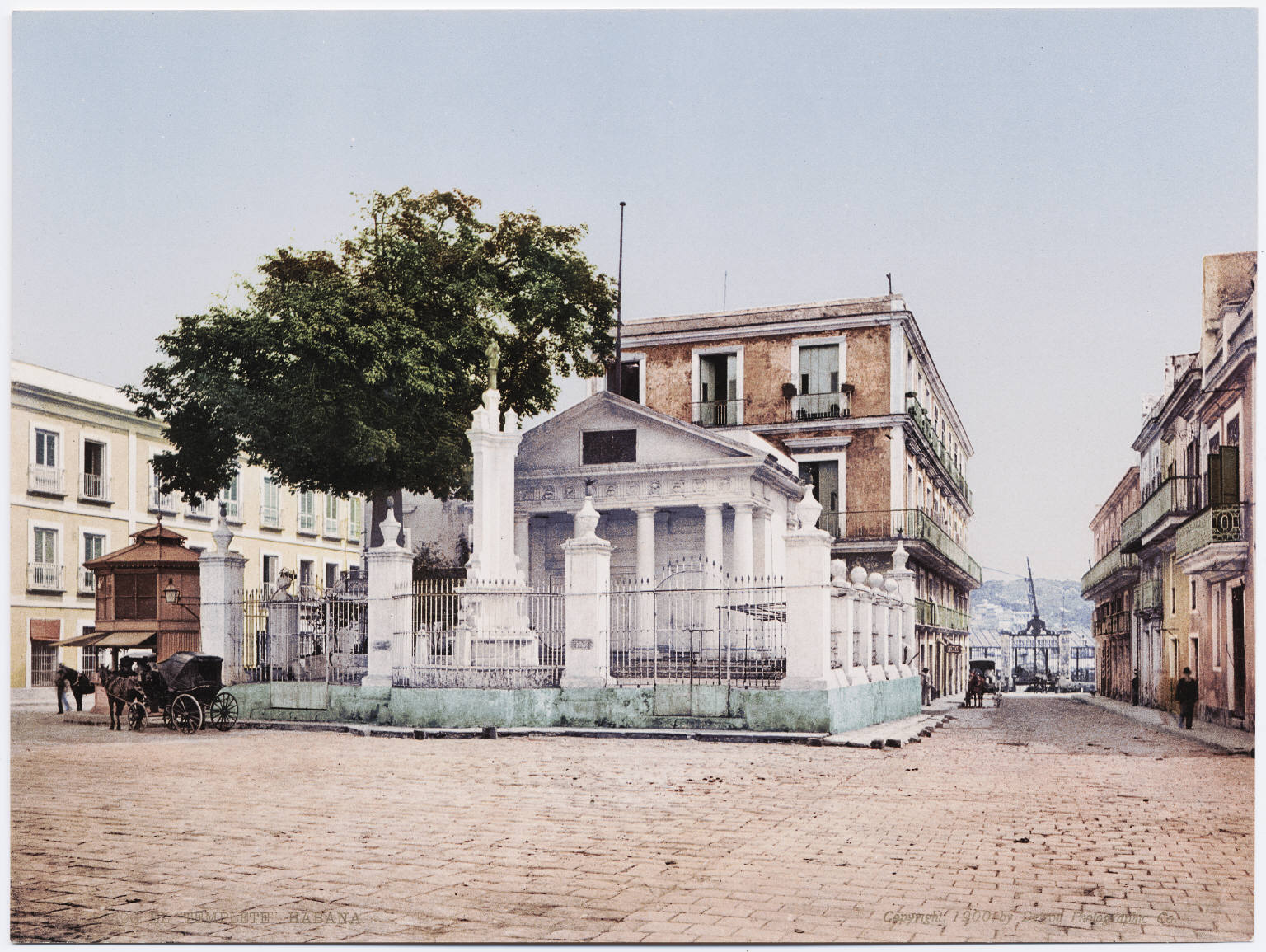
- Interactive map of the El Templete area

General information
- Type: Memorial
- Architectural style: Neo-classical
- Location: Havana Vieja, Ciudad de La Habana, Cuba
- Coordinates: 23°08′25.78″N 82°20′56.52″W

Technical details
- Material: Stone

El Templete is a monument to the initial mass of San Cristóbal de la Habana celebrated on November 16, 1519.

Jean Baptiste Vermay painted the interior of the monument.

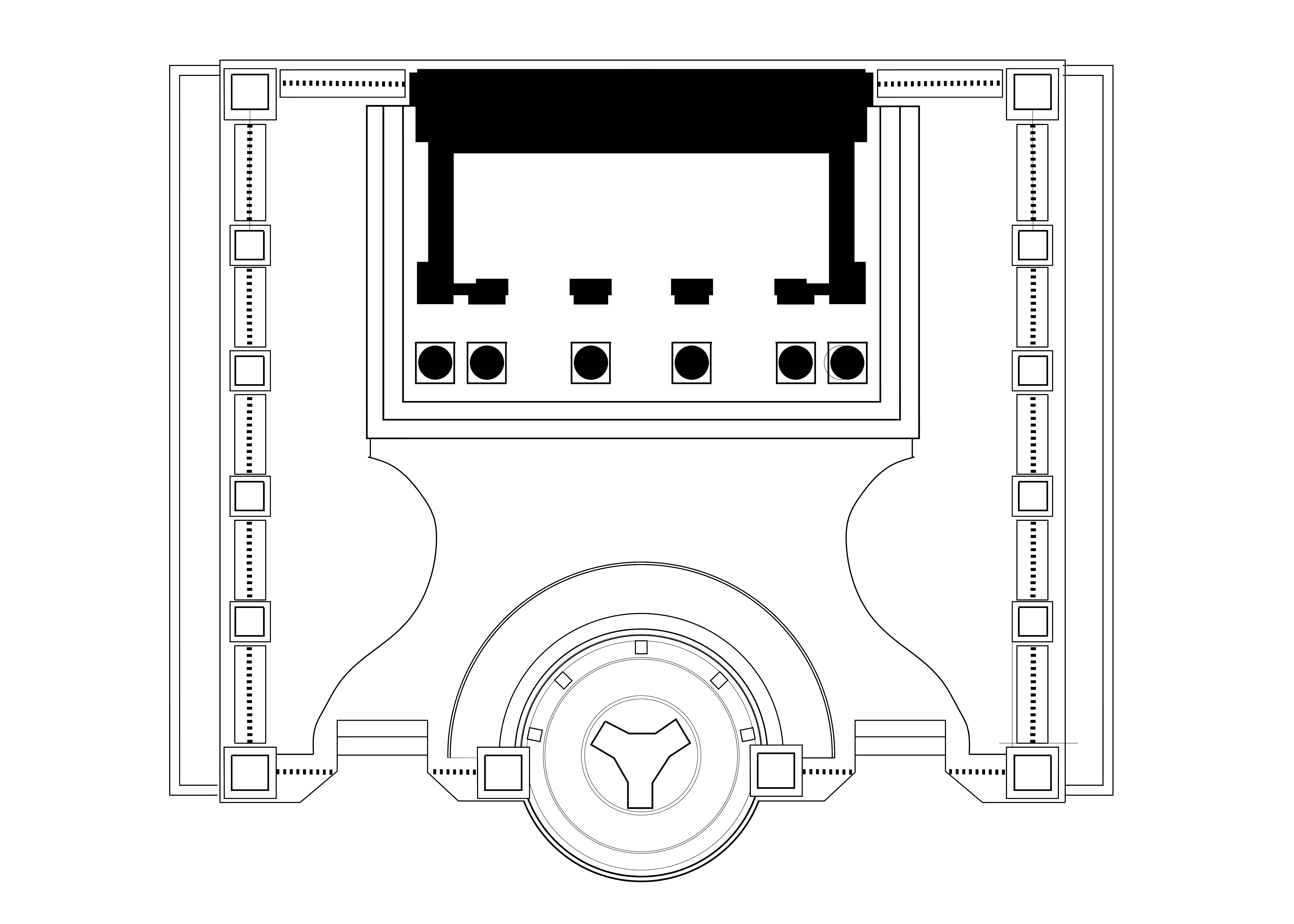
Floor Plan

== See also ==
- La Alameda de Paula, Havana

== Gallery ==
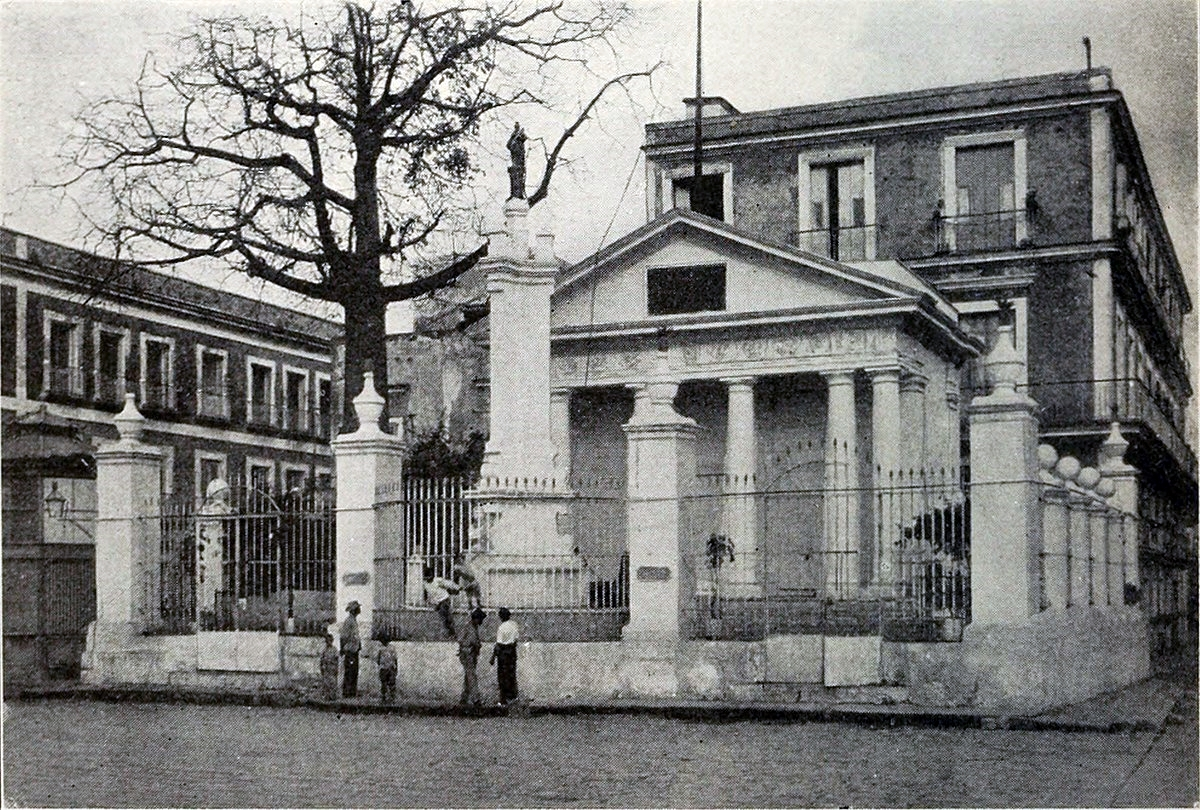

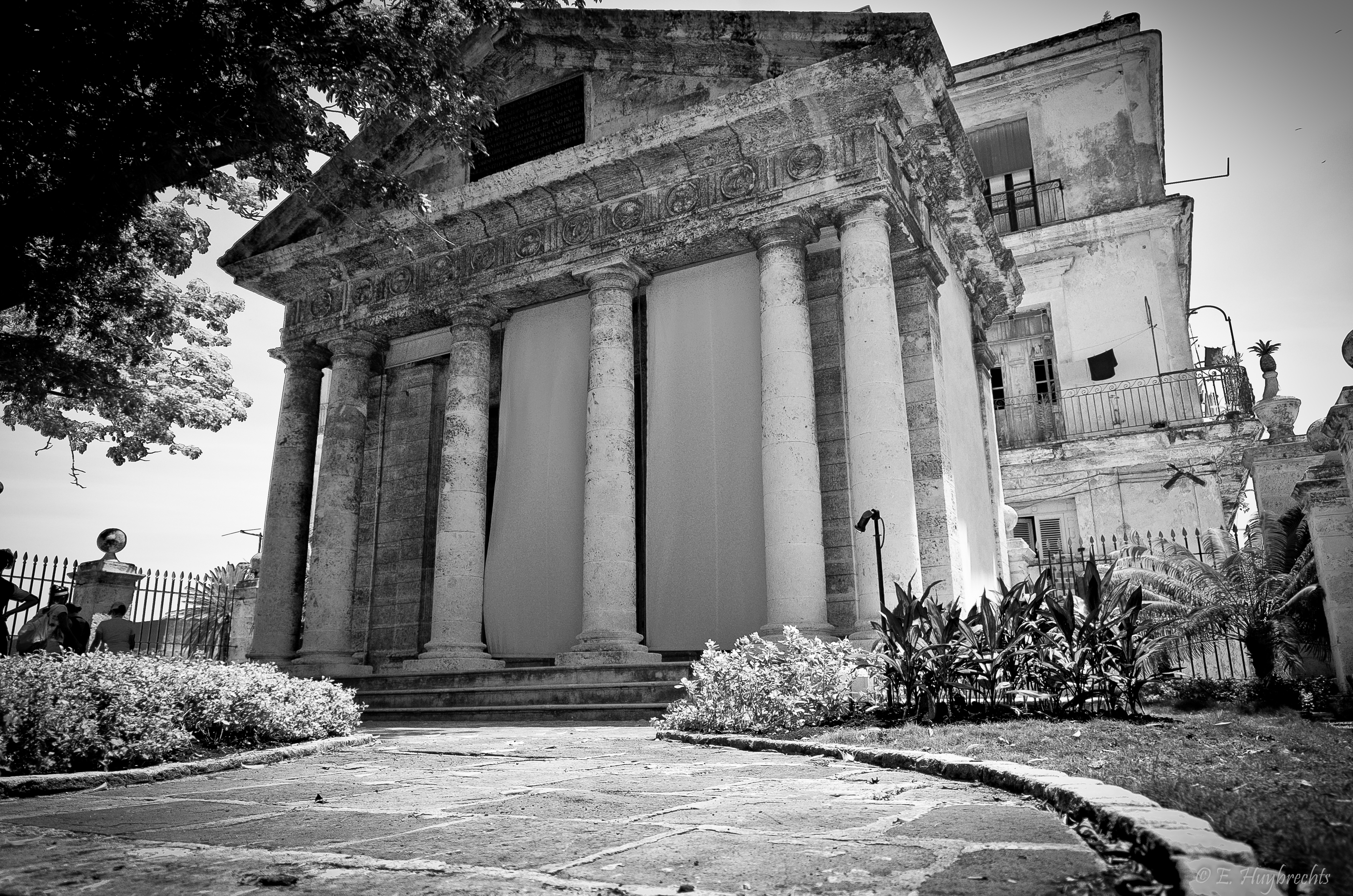

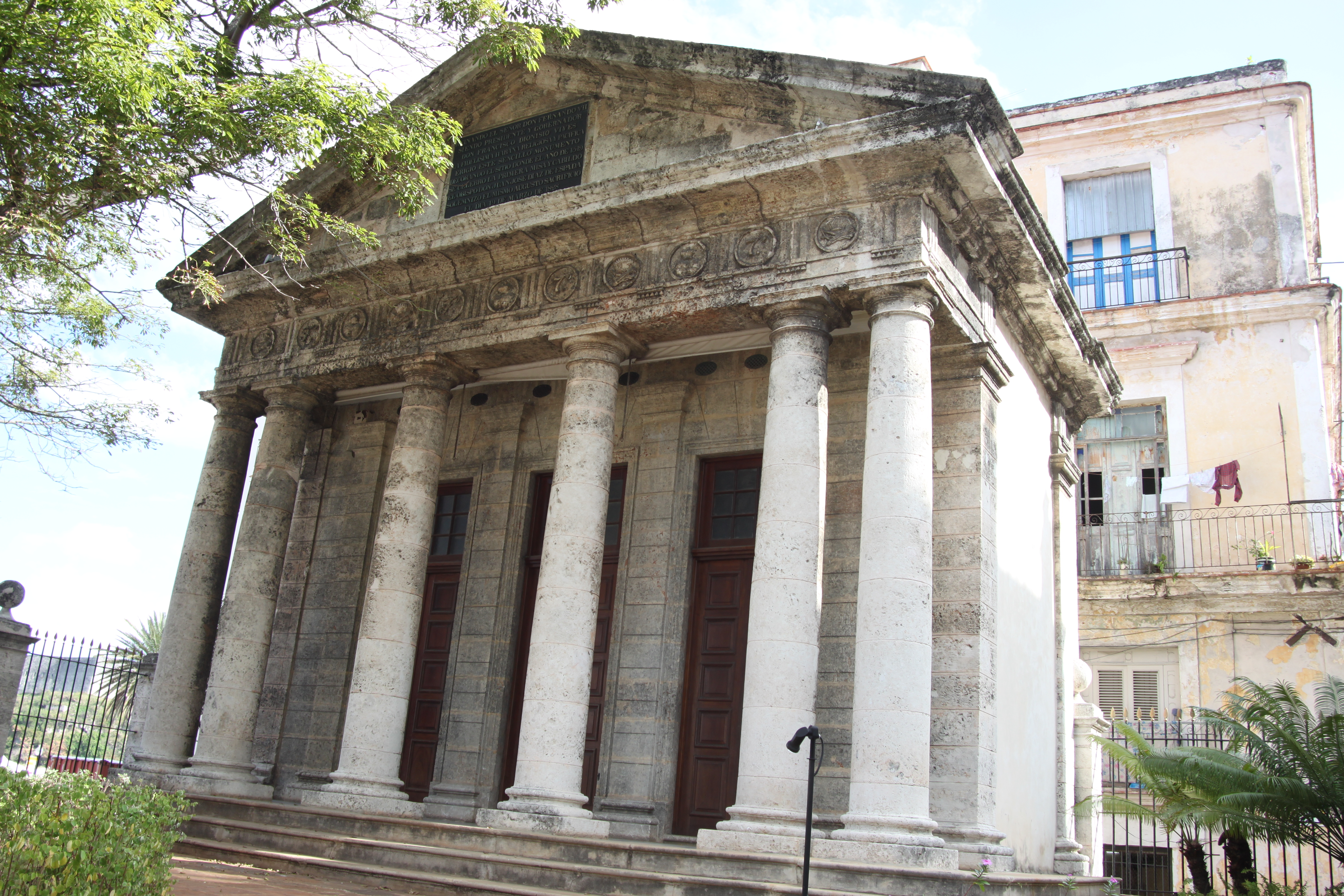

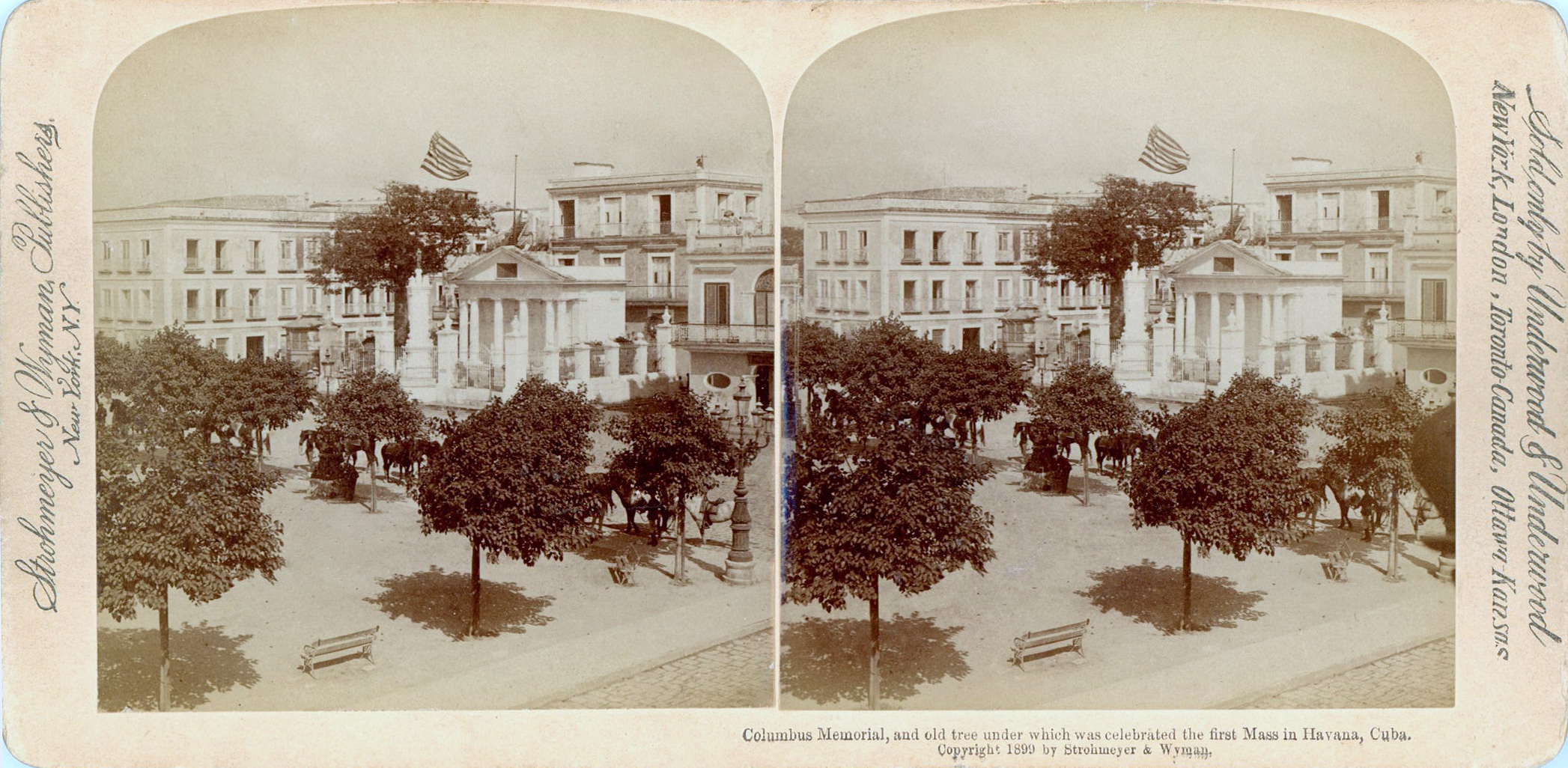
"El Templete" in 1899
