= Jean Baptiste Vermay =

French-born Cuban artist and educator

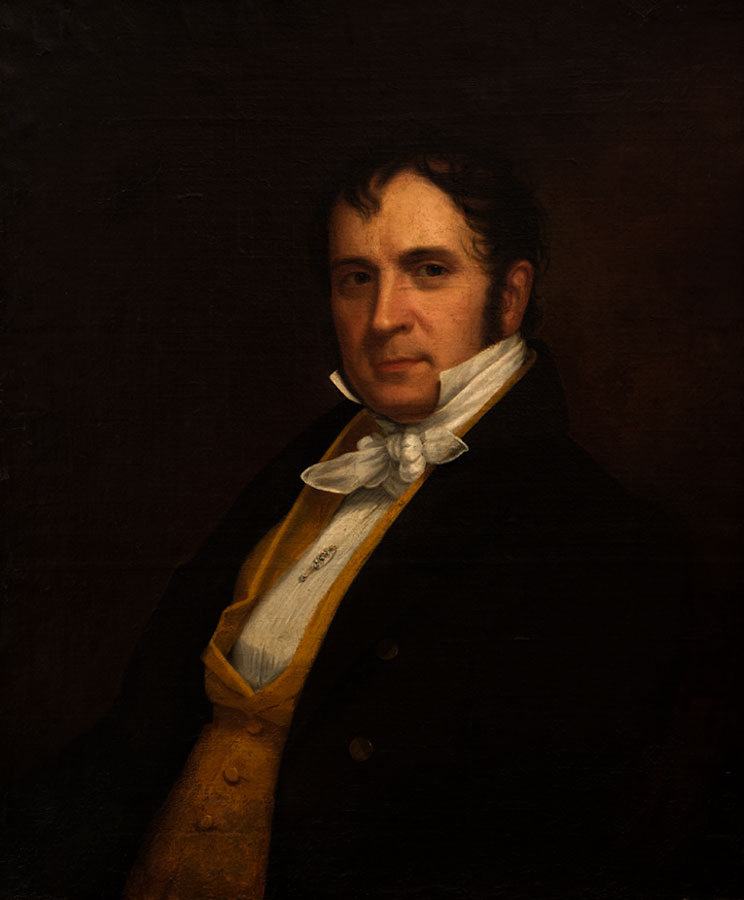
- Eliab Metcalf, Portrait of Jean-Baptiste Vermay, Museo Nacional de Bellas Artes de La Habana
- Born: 15 October 1786; Tournan-en-Brie, Île-de-France, France
- Died: 30 March 1833 (aged 46); Havana, Cuba
- Other name: Jean-Baptiste Vermay
- Occupations: Painter, sculptor, caricaturist, educator, musician, architect

Jean-Baptiste Vermay (1786–1833) was a French-born Cuban painter, sculptor, caricaturist, educator, musician, and architect. He was the founding director of the Academia Nacional de Bellas Artes San Alejandro.

== Biography ==
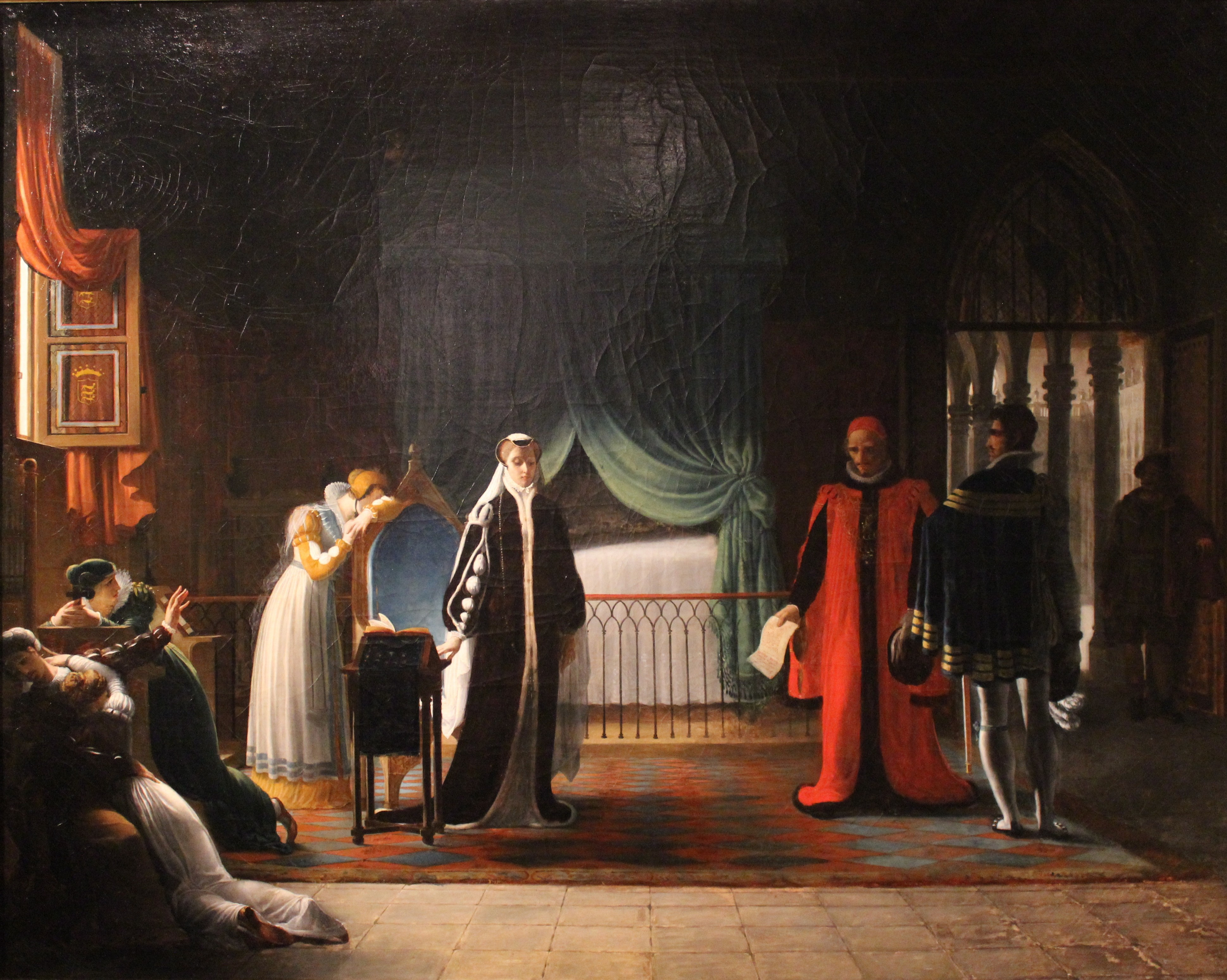
L'Mort de Marie Stuart (c. 1908) by Jean Baptiste Vermay

Jean-Baptiste Vermay was born on 15 October 1786 in Tournan-en-Brie, Île-de-France. In 1797, he moved to Paris to study in the studio of Jacques-Louis David. His classmate and friend was Joseph Leclerc de Baumé, the French painter. He also studied in Rome and Florence.

In 1808, he won honors for his work L'Mort de Marie Stuart at the L'Exposition Universelle de 1808, a world's fair.

In 1815, Vermay moved to Cuba. Starting in 1818, Vermay was the founding director of the Academia Nacional de Bellas Artes San Alejandro. He remained at the school until his death.

Vermay painted the interior of the El Templete. Vermay in Cuba was appointed "Room Painter" of the King of Spain, Ferdinand VII. He died on 30 March 1833 in Havana from cholera.
