= Jean-Claude Nicolas Forestier =

French forest engineer

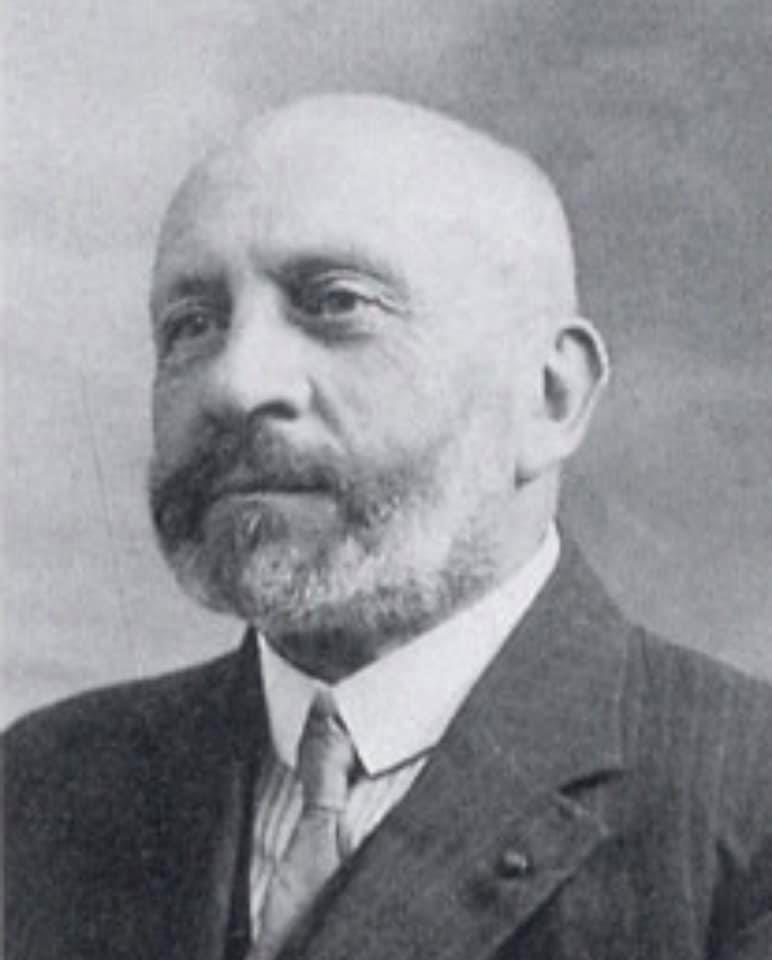
- Born: January 9, 1861; Aix-les-Bains, France
- Died: October 26, 1930 (aged 69); Paris, France
- Occupation: Landscape architect
- Known for: Paseo del Prado

Jean-Claude Nicolas Forestier (9 January 1861 – 26 October 1930) was a French landscape architect who trained with Adolphe Alphand and became conservator of the promenades of Paris.

== Works ==
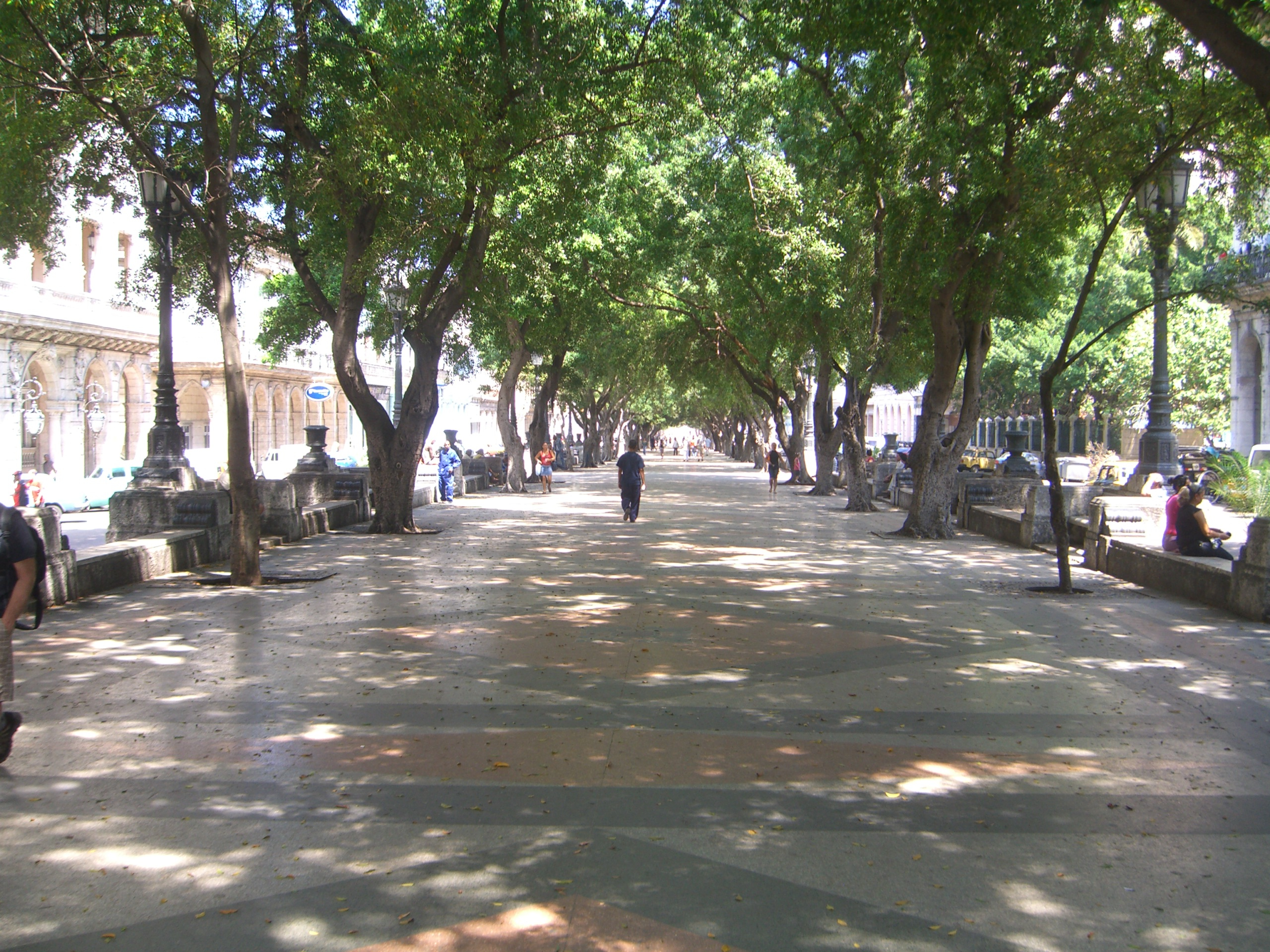
Paseo del Prado, promenade. Havana. 1925

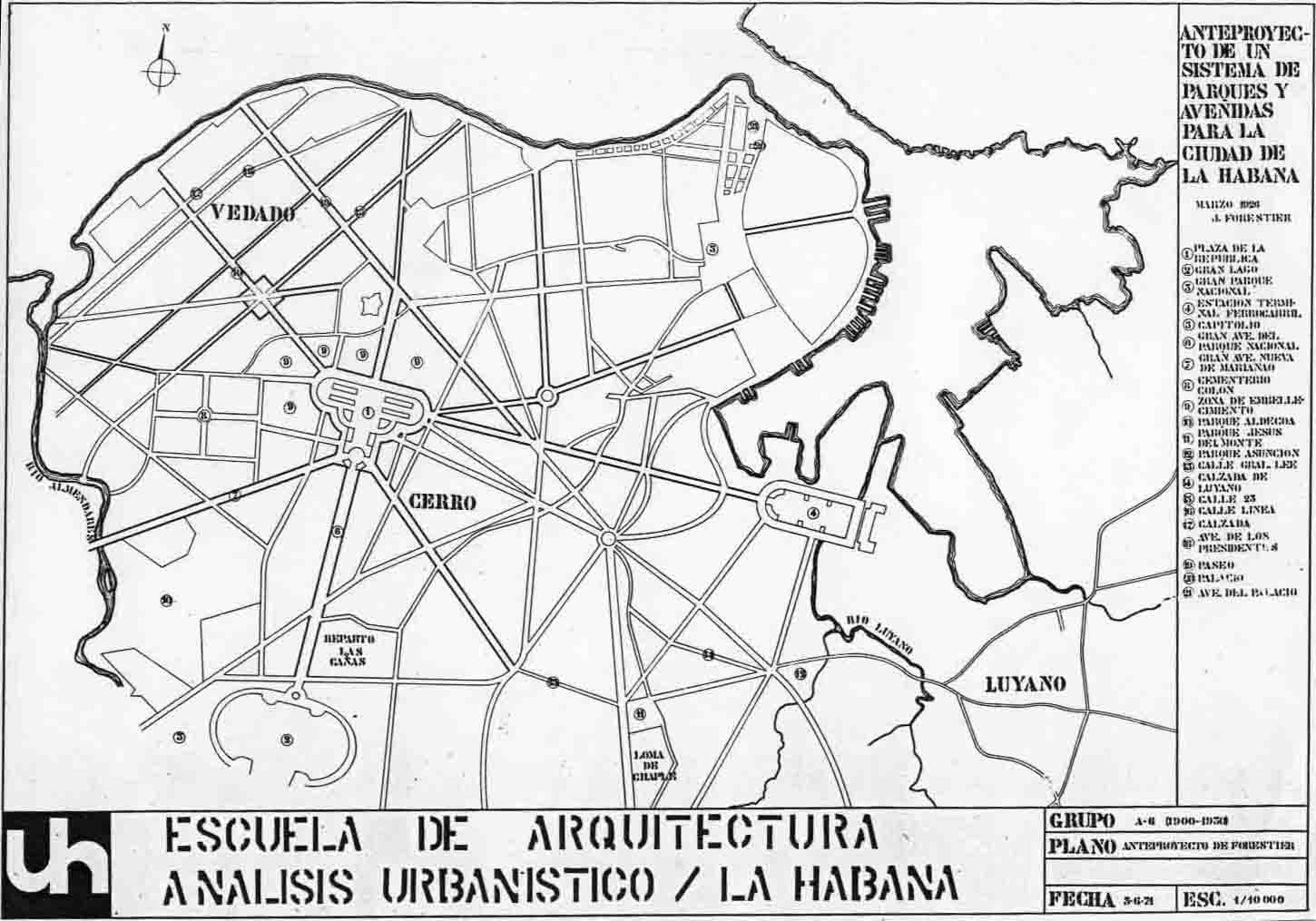
Master plan for Havana

Forestier studied at the École Polytechnique de Paris from 1880 to 1882. He also studied at the École libre des sciences politiques, and at the École forestière de Nancy.

Forestier worked as a civil servant for the City of Paris from 1887-1927. There, he worked on the Bois de Vincennes (1889), the Bois de Boulogne and the western sector of the Promenades de Paris (1898). He also worked on the Avenue de Breteuil (1898) and developed an arboretum at Vincennes and the gardens of the Champ-de-Mars below the Eiffel Tower. Forestier also did design projects in the French Protectorate of Morocco.

Forestier also worked in Spain, setting up gardens in Seville including the Maria Luisa Park (1914) which showcased botanicals, French geometry and Latin and Islamic design and decoration. The park also includes an honorary statue of Forestier. In Barcelona, Forestier designed the gardens of Montjuic, including Laribel Park, the Miramar gardens, and the Greek Theatre Gardens. Elsewhere in Barcelona, he worked on Pedralbes Park (1916). Forestier introduced several ornamental plants to Catalonia, such as rosewood. Throughout Barcelona, he worked closely with Maria Rubió i Tudurí. Forestier also worked in private commissions, such as the Palacio de Liria (1916) in Madrid and the gardens of La Casa del Rey Moro in Ronda.

In 1923, he also made a plan for the improvement of Buenos Aires and the seaside town of Ostende, Buenos Aires. In 1925 he became Inspector of Gardens for the International Exhibition of Decorative Arts and undertook projects in the Americas. In 1925, he moved to Havana for five years to collaborate with architects and landscape designers, where he designed the gardens for the El Capitolio and worked on the master plan of the city, aiming to create a harmonic balance between classical forms and the tropical landscape. He embraced and connected the city's road networks while accentuating prominent landmarks. He had great influence in Havana, although many of his ideas were cut short by the great depression in 1929.

In 1927, Forestier began working with the city of Lisbon on garden design and urban planning. Forestier's Haussmanian tradition and tendencies towards monumentality were popular with cities looking to represent ideas of nationalism in their design. Forestier developed an urban plan and road system articulating from the Avenida da Liberdade. Although his plans were not implemented, his ideas influenced future urban planning in Lisbon. His last major project was the garden of the Bastide du Roy for the Princess of Polignac near Biot.

The scholar Vincent Casals Costa argues that Forestier's practical model of urban design is that of a "city-park." It includes features such as the park as a framework within a monumental city which follows Fredric Law Olmsted's avenues model, internal division within the city, and regional elements, and functionality.

== See also ==
- Havana Plan Piloto
- Paseo del Prado, Havana
- La Alameda de Paula, Havana
- Paseo de Tacón

== Writings ==
- FORESTIER Jean Claude Nicolas, Grandes villes et systèmes de parcs, Paris, Hachette, 1908, 50p.
- FORESTIER Jean Claude Nicolas, Grandes villes et systèmes de parcs, Paris, Norma, rééd. du texte de 1908 présentée par B. Leclerc et S. Tarrago, 1997, 383p.
- FORESTIER Jean Claude Nicolas, Jardins,[carnet de plans et de croquis, Paris, Ed Picard, 1994.
- LECLERC Bénédicte, Jean Claude Nicolas FORESTIER,1861-1930, du Jardin au paysage urbain, Paris, Ed Picard, 2000, 283p.
- LECLERC Bénédicte, Jean Claude Nicolas FORESTIER,1861-1930, La science des jardins au service de l’art urbain, Revue Pages Paysages, N°2, 1988–89, p24-29.
- LECLERC Bénédicte, Jardin, Paysage, urbanisme : la mission de Jean C-N Forestier au Maroc en 1913, Nancy, Ed Ecole d’architecture de Nancy, 1993, s-p.
- LE DANTEC Jean-Pierre, Le Sauvage et le régulier. Art des jardins et paysagisme en France au XXième siècle, Paris, Ed du Moniteur, 2002, p93 à 101.
