= Paseo del Prado, Havana =

Promenade in Havana, Cuba

Paseo del Prado
- Interactive map of the Paseo del Prado area

General information
- Type: Promenade
- Location: Havana, Cuba
- Coordinates: 23°08′21″N 82°21′33″W
- Inaugurated: 1925

Technical details
- Material: Terrazo, coral stone, bronze
- Floor count: 1

Design and construction
- Architect: Jean-Claude Nicolas Forestier

Paseo del Prado is a street and promenade in Havana, Cuba, near the location of the old city wall, and the division between Centro Habana and Old Havana. Technically, the Paseo del Prado includes the entire length of Paseo Martí approximately from the Malecon to Calle Máximo Gómez, (Note: In 1902 when the Havana City Council renamed the street Máximo Gómez, few could imagine that this name was not going to take among the people of the City who would continue to call it "Calle Monte.") the Fuente de la India fountain. The promenade has had several names; it was renamed Paseo de Martí in 1898 with the island's independence from Spain. Despite the historic references, the people of Havana simply call it "El Prado".

== History ==
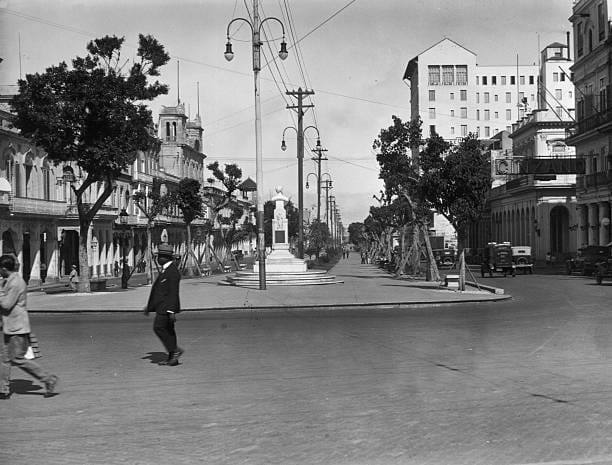
Paseo del Prado de La Habana

Paseo del Prado before its design and construction in 1925 by Forestier

El Prado ca. 1926 immediately after its construction

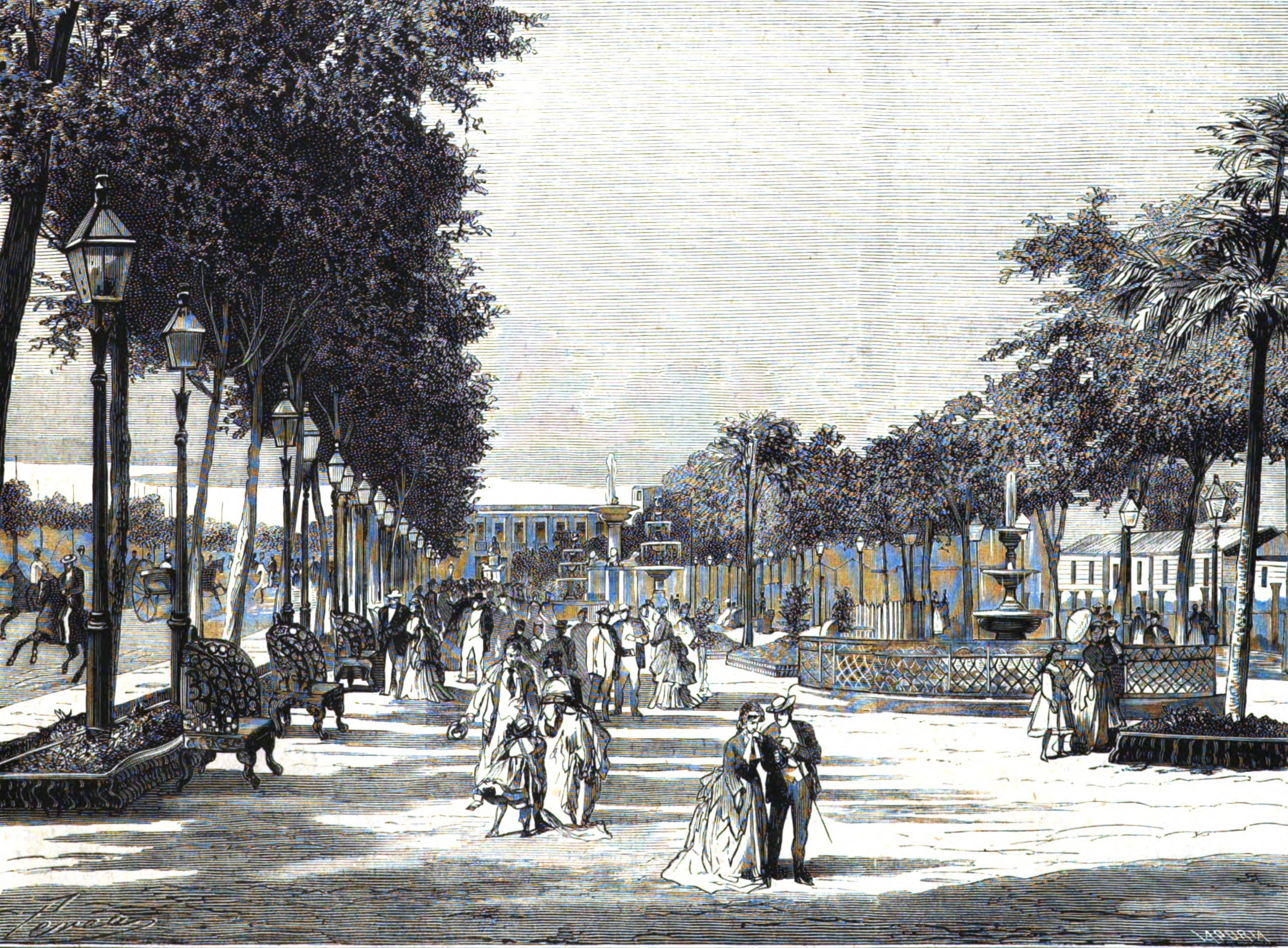
Alameda de Isabel II in Paseo del Prado, Havana, as is depicted in La Ilustración Española y Americana in 1874.

Construction of the first European-style boulevard in Havana, the first street of its type outside the city walls, was proposed by Don Felipe Fons de Viela y Ondeano in 1770, and work was completed in the mid-1830s during the term of Captain General (Spanish: Capitanía General de Cuba) Miguel Tacón y Rosique (1834–1838) (Note: Miguel Tacón y Rosique (Cartagena, January 10, 1775 - Madrid, October 12, 1855) First Marquis of the Union of Cuba, (later elevated to Duchy), Duke of the Union of Cuba, was a nobleman, sailor and Spanish military, Lieutenant General of the Royal Navy, Field Marshal of the Army of Earth and I Duke of the Union of Cuba.) who was also responsible for the Paseo de Tacón, the Plaza del Vapor and the Tacón Theatre.

in 1925 French landscape architect Jean-Claude Nicolas Forestier redesigned the Paseo del Prado, and lined it with trees, bronze sculptures of lions, coral stone walls and marble benches. The bronze lions were added in 1928. The Lions were commissioned by President Gerardo Machado. They were authored by French sculptor Jean Puiforcat and Cuban-born master caster Juan Comas Masique, who used the metal from decommissioned cannons to forge the lions.

Lining the boulevard are important buildings such as the Gran Teatro de La Habana, hotels (including the Hotel Sevilla), cinemas such as the Fausto , theaters, and mansions imitating styles from Madrid, París and Vienna. El Prado was the first paved street in Havana. When El Capitolio was built in 1929 that section of the promenade was removed.

At the corner of Cárcel street the car dealership Packard & Cunnigham was located, and in 1940 the radio network RHC-Cadena Azul established its studios on the Prado.

== Jean-Claude Nicolas Forestier ==
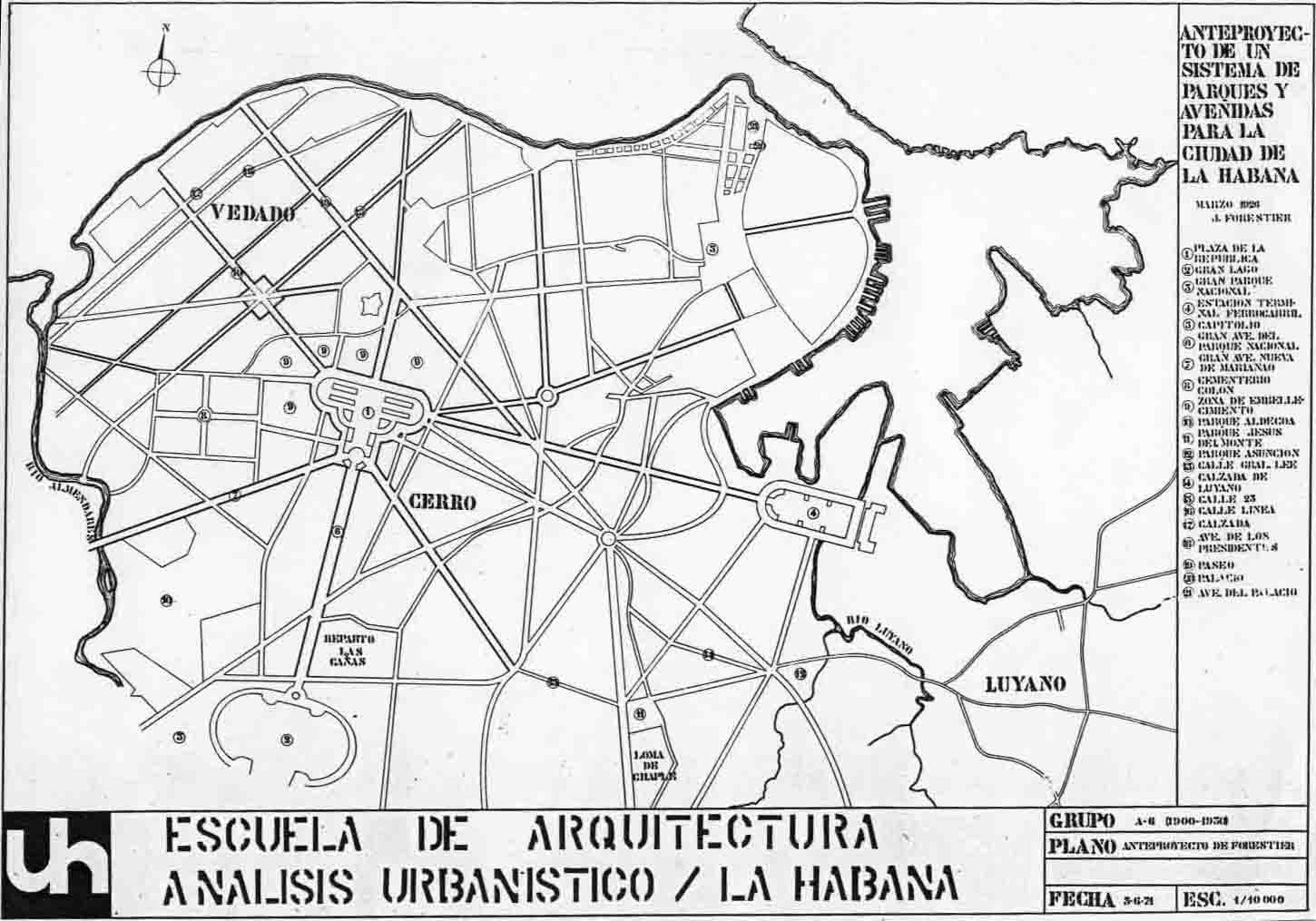
Forestier's master plan for Havana of 1924

Jean-Claude Nicolas Forestier (9 January 1861 in Aix-les-Bains – 26 October 1930 in Paris) was a French landscape architect, who trained with Adolphe Alphand and became conservator of the promenades of Paris. Forestier was the landscape architect of El Prado and had moved to Havana from France for five years to collaborate with architects and landscape architects on various projects throughout the city including the design of the gardens for the Capitolio. He worked on the master plan of the city with the aim to create a harmonic balance between classical forms and the tropical landscape of Havana. He embraced and connected the city's road network while accentuating prominent landmarks through a series of parks, avenues, "paseos," and boulevards which 50 years later proved to be a direct contrast to the Havana Plan Piloto of Josep Lluis Sert which was influenced by CIAM planning principles. The Congrès internationaux d'architecture moderne (CIAM), was an organization founded in 1928 and disbanded in 1959, responsible for a series of events and congresses arranged across Europe by the most prominent architects of the time, with the objective of spreading the principles of the Modern Movement focusing in all the main domains of architecture, landscape architecture, urbanism, industrial design, and many other design practices. Nicolas Forestier's influence has left his mark on Havana; many of his ideas were cut short by the Great Depression of 1929.

== Deterioration ==
The Paseo del Prado had been a replacement for the first promenade in the City of La Alameda de Paula which was built around 1776 by Antonio Fernández Trevejo. By the 1950s, families were moving from the Prado to Miramar and other parts of the city such as the Vedado and Siboney. After the 1959 revolution and the ongoing U.S. embargo against Cuba, the Prado streets and many of its buildings were, like the majority of buildings in Havana, physically deteriorated to the point that many collapsed and remain to this day in a ruined state.

== Gallery ==
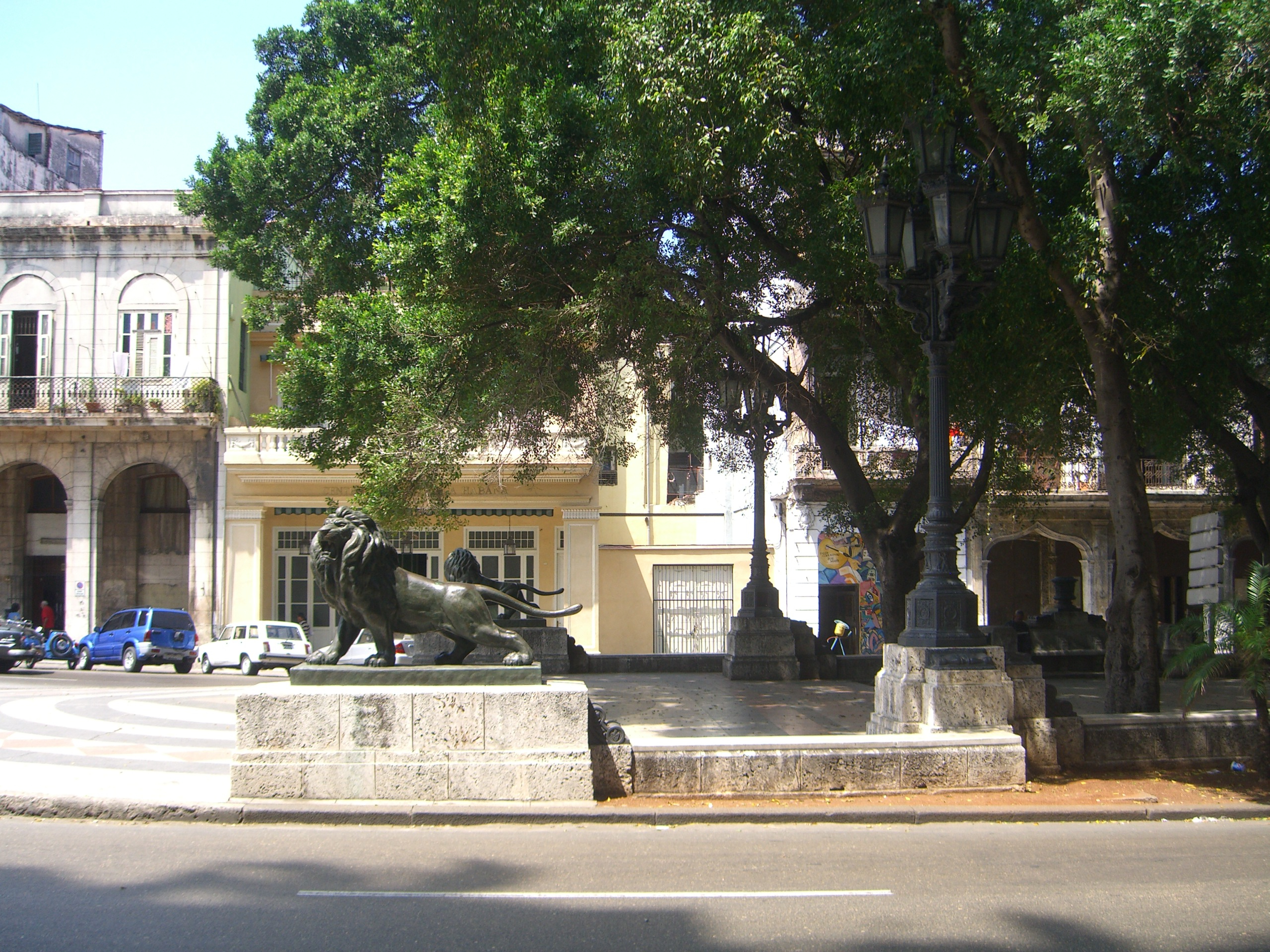

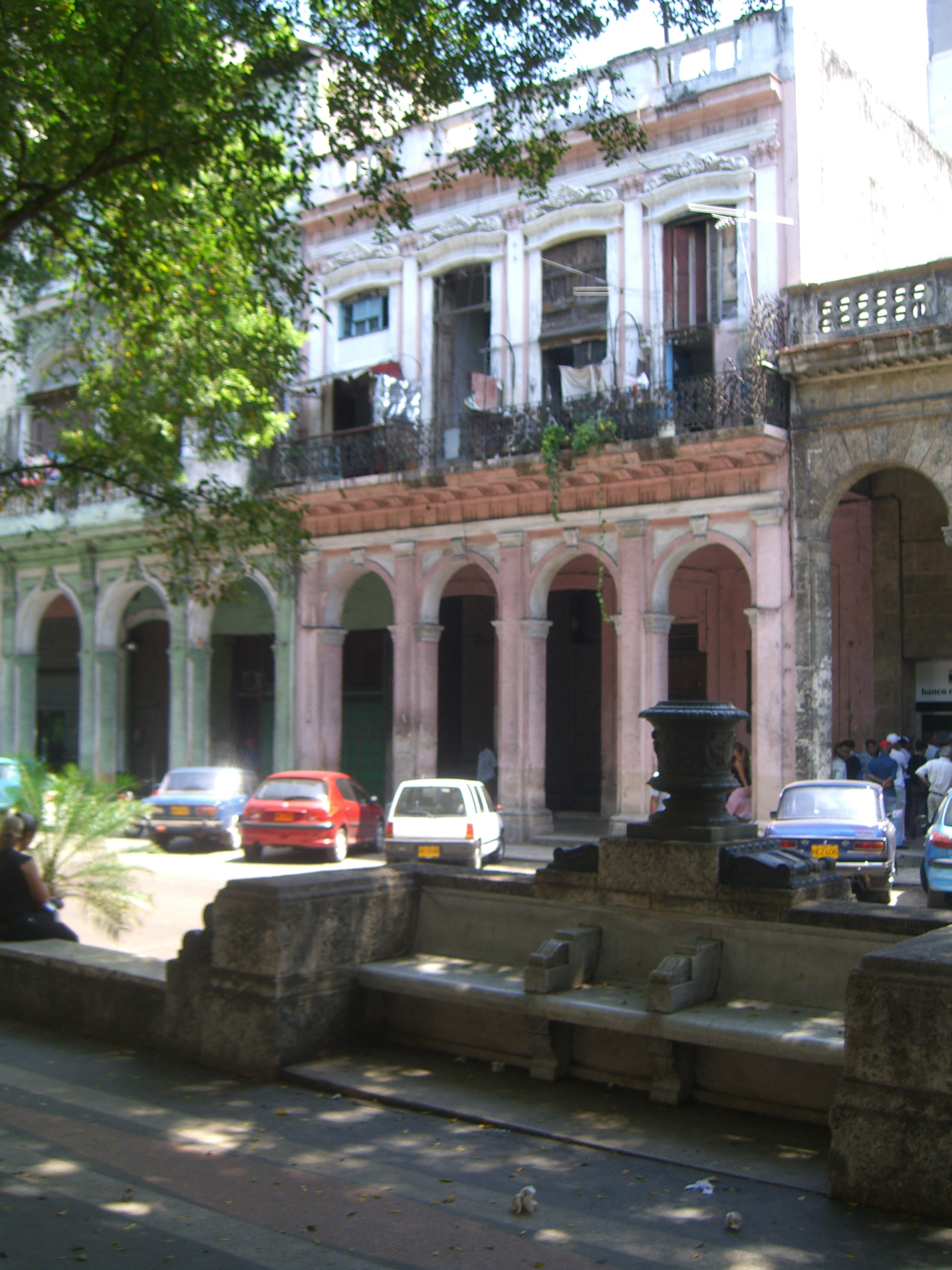

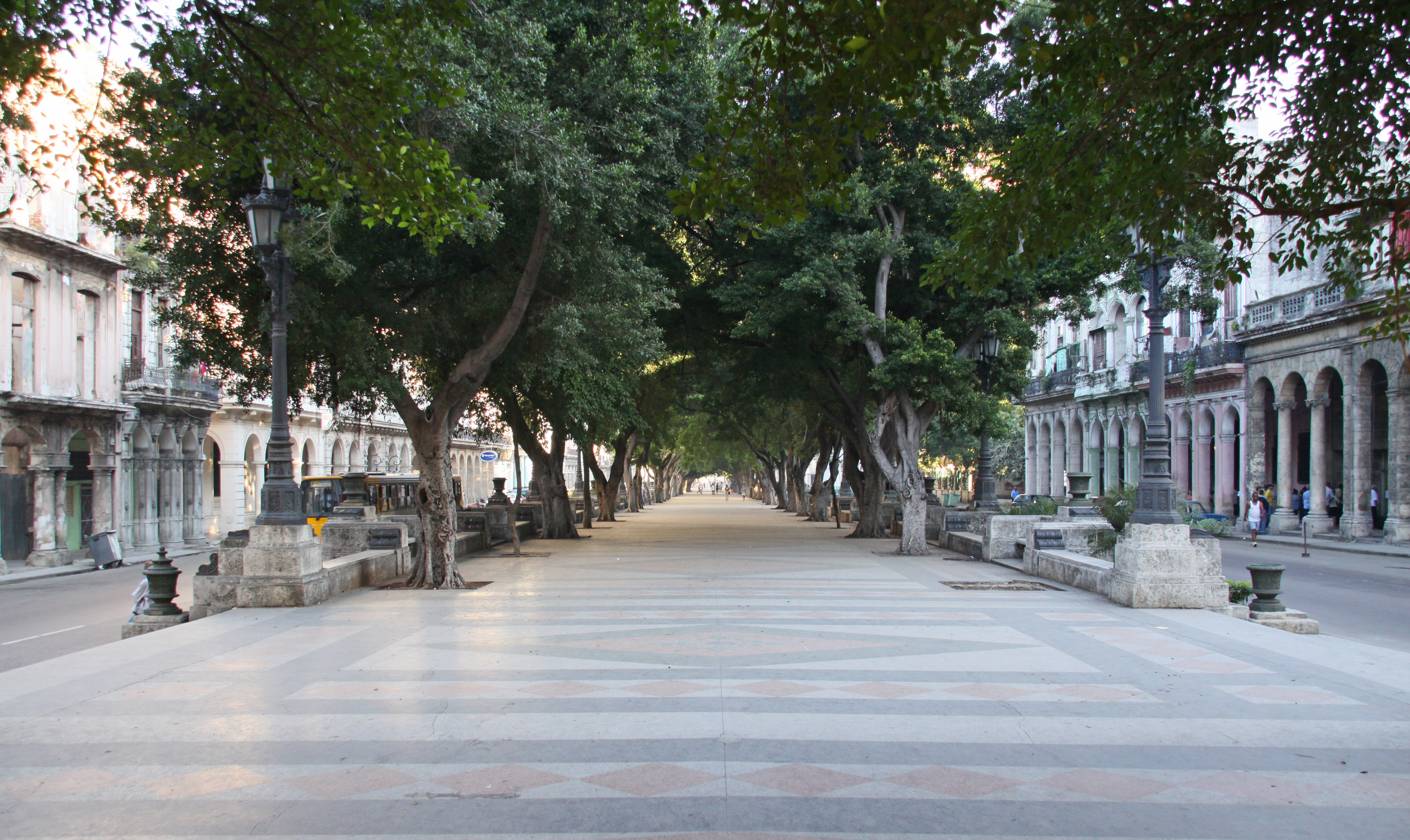

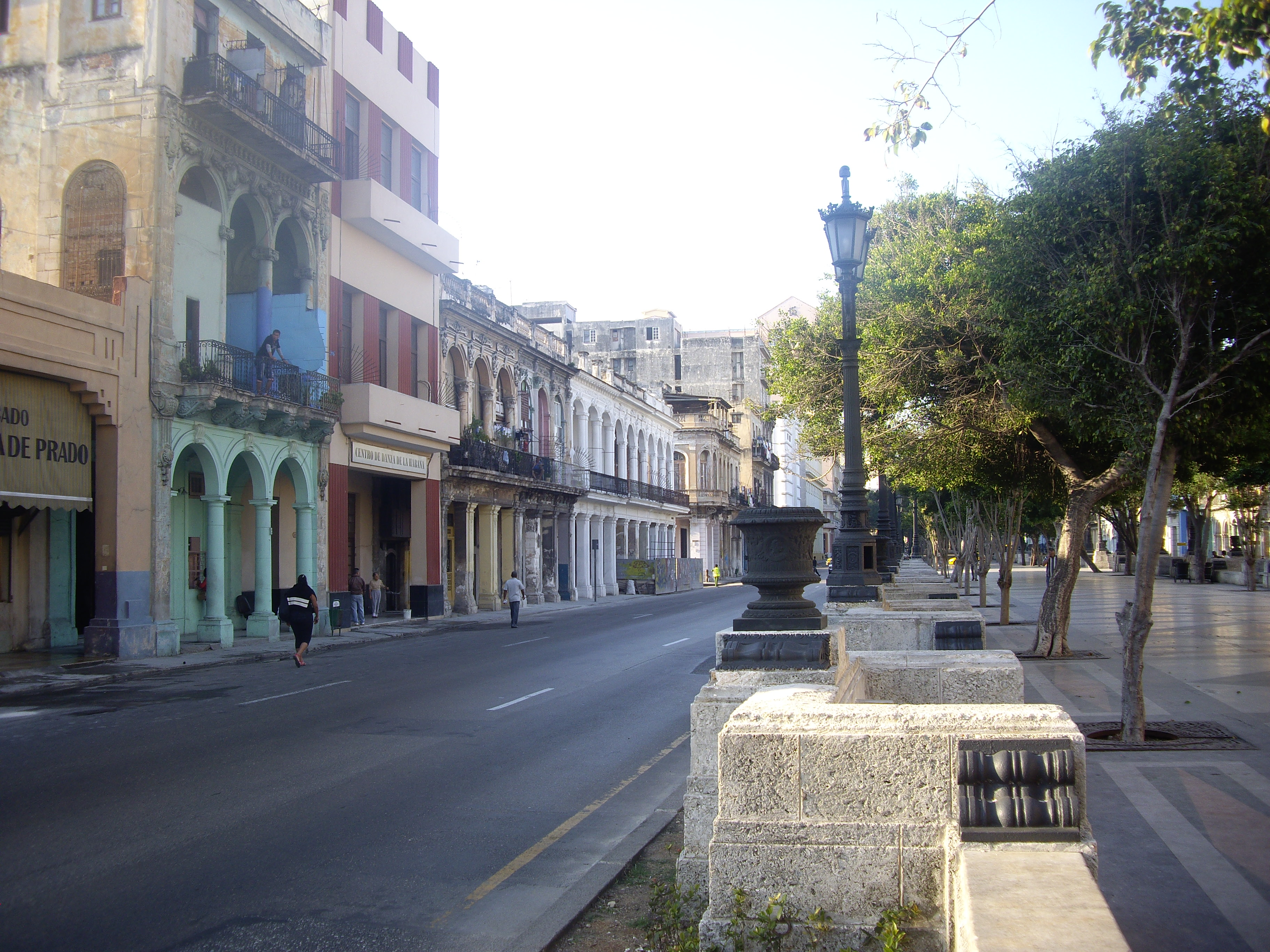

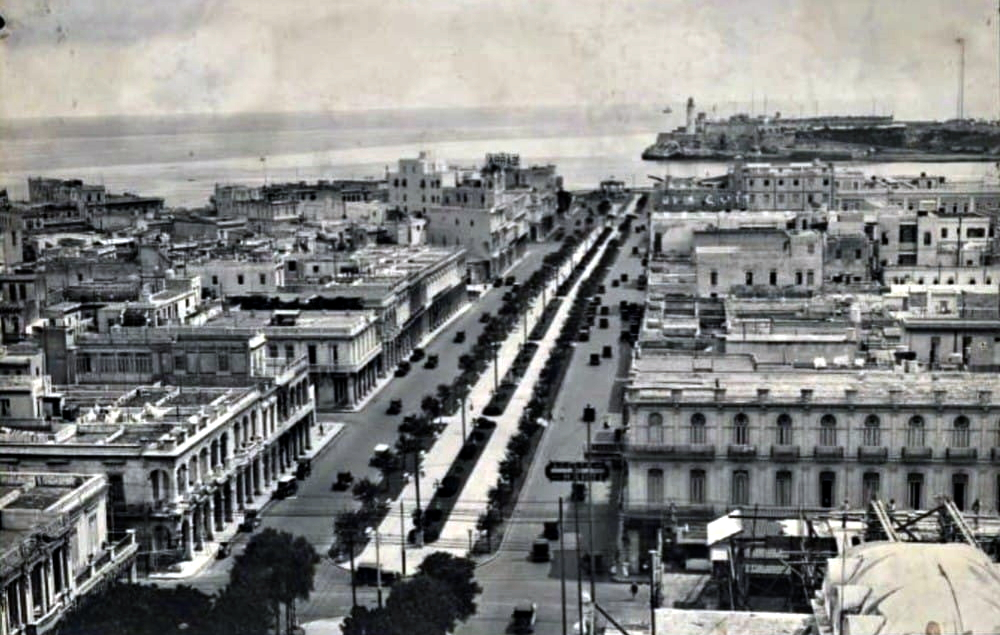
Panoramic image of the Prado. Havana, Cuba. ca 1925

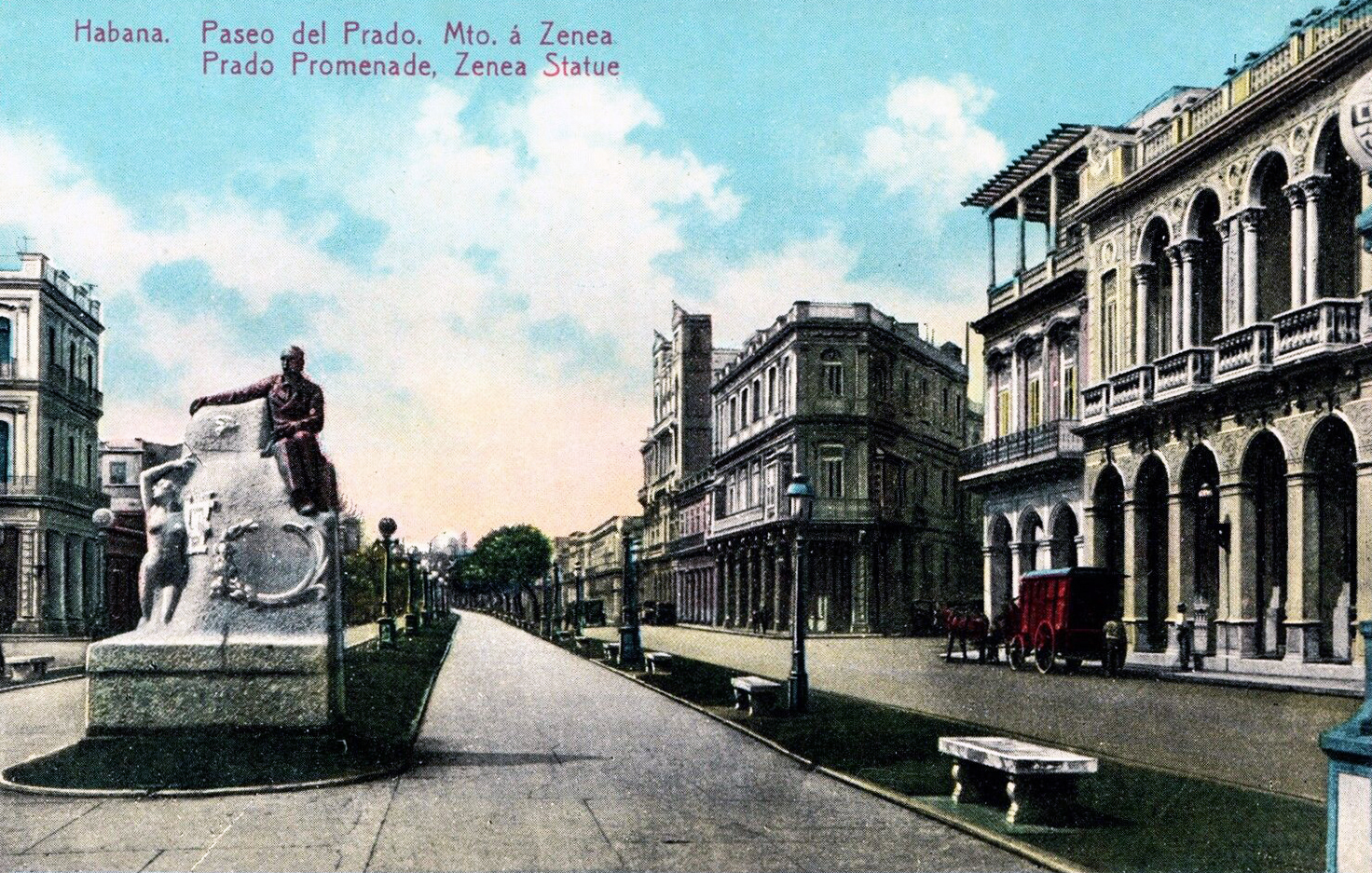
circa 1918

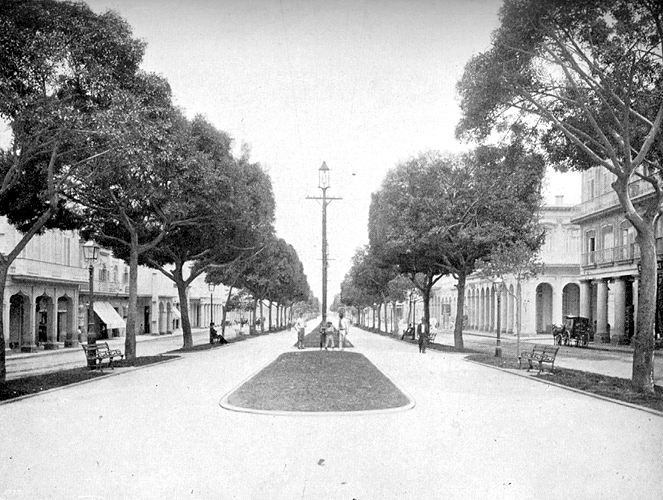
circa 1920

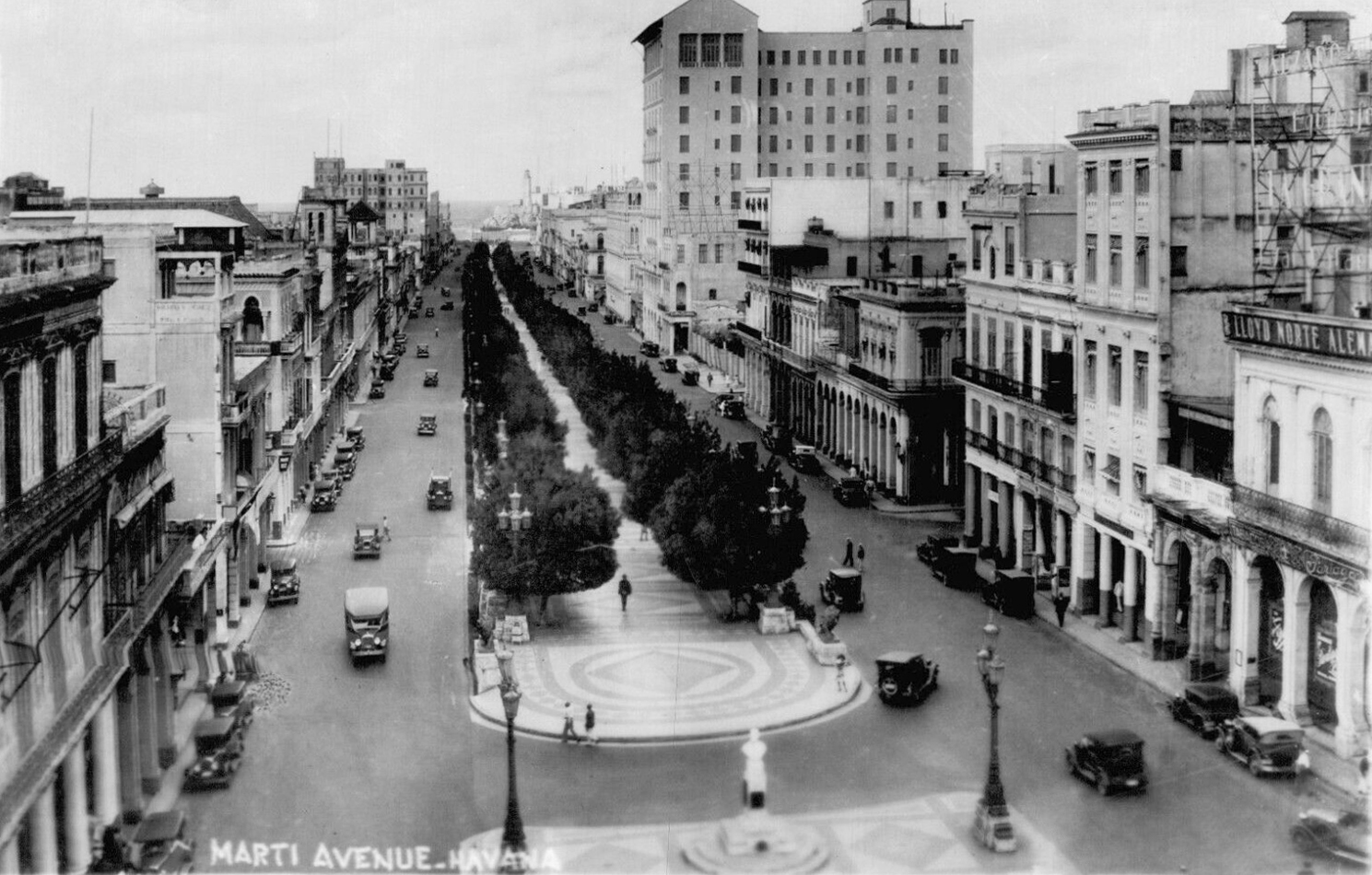
circa 1930

== See also ==
- Havana Plan Piloto
- La Alameda de Paula, Havana
- Paseo de Tacón
- Fuente de la India
