= Alameda de Paula =

La Alameda de Paula
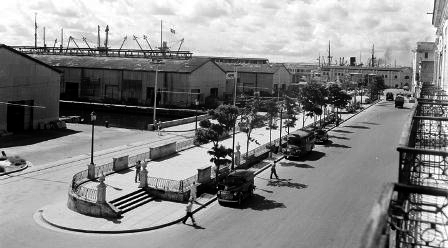
- Alameda de Paula, 1947
- Interactive map of the La Alameda de Paula area

General information
- Type: Promenade
- Architectural style: Neoclassical
- Location: Havana Vieja, Ciudad de La Habana, Cuba
- Coordinates: 23.1323°N 82.3480°W

The Alameda de Paula is a promenade in Havana, Cuba. It was the first to be built in the city designed by Antonio Fernández de Trebejos y Zaldívar.

== History ==
The Alameda de Paula was commissioned by Captain General (Spanish: Capitanía General de Cuba) Felipe de Fons de Viela, member of the court of King Carlos III. It was built by architect Antonio Fernández de Trebejos in 1777. The site of the old Rincón was a refuse dump, initially the promenade was a dirt track with some benches and flanked by two rows of poplar trees. It was given the name Alameda de Paula because of its proximity to the Hospital and Iglesia of San Francisco de Paula which had been built in 1664. An ornamented marble fountain was built in 1847. Between 1803 and 1805 the pavement was tiled, a fountain and stone benches, lampposts and the marble column were added. It qualified as entertainment for the residents of the Villa de San Cristóbal, who were lacking recreational sites at that time. The Alameda de Paula became one of Havana's most important social and cultural spaces and the model of the Paseo del Prado designed in 1925 by Jean-Claude Nicolas Forestier.

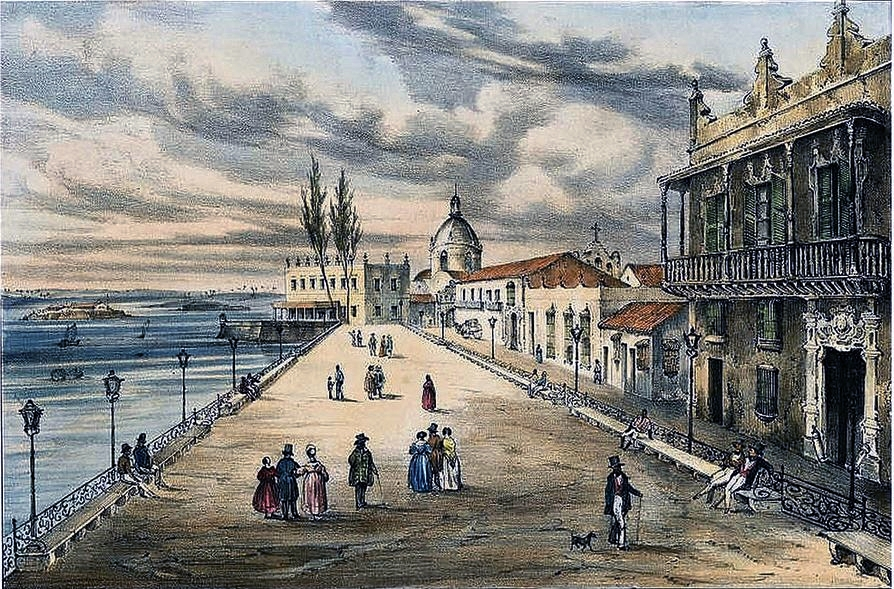
Frédéric Mialhe_Álbum pintoresco de la Isla de Cuba. Showing Alameda de Paula [1] with the Hospital and Iglesia de San Francisco de Paula. 1840. It was given the name Alameda de Paula because of its proximity to the old Hospital and Iglesia of San Francisco de Paula.

== Renovation ==
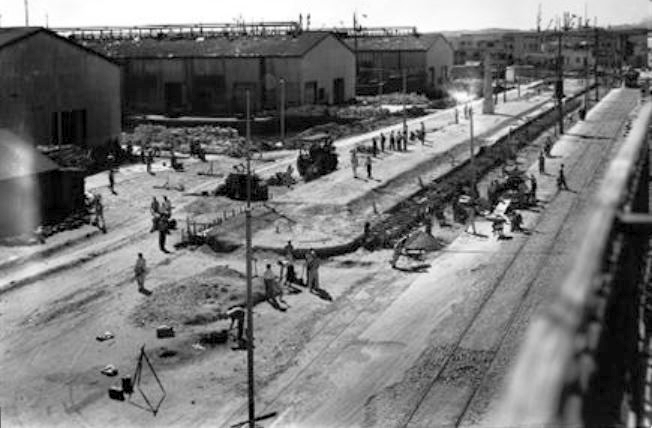
Alameda de Paula during 1940s renovation

The promenade was the subject of various transformations in the course of the 19th century; the embankment was tiled, a fountain was located there and the back of the seats was latticed. By that time it was considered the most popular and busiest place in the city. Toilets were built which increased its popularity. In the 1940s, squares were drawn at its ends, widened, and provided with access stairs and seats, street lamps were updated.

In 1841, the stairs that gave access to the promenade were widened and several lampposts were added. In the year 2000, the Havana promenade was restored and extended until it reached the Iglesia de San Francisco de Paula.

== Coliseo of Havana ==
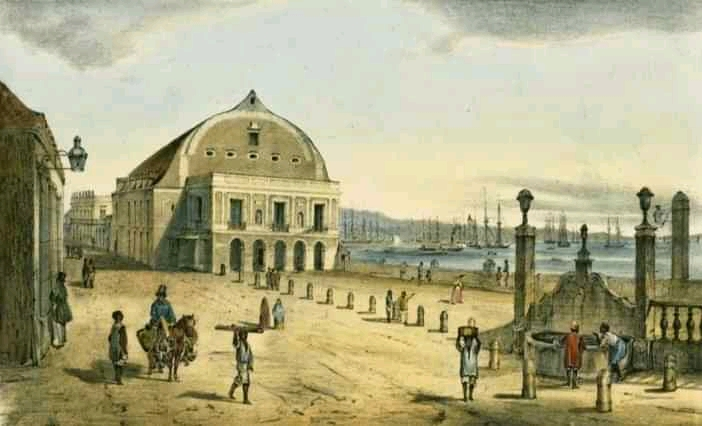
El Coliseo o Teatro Principal de La Habana

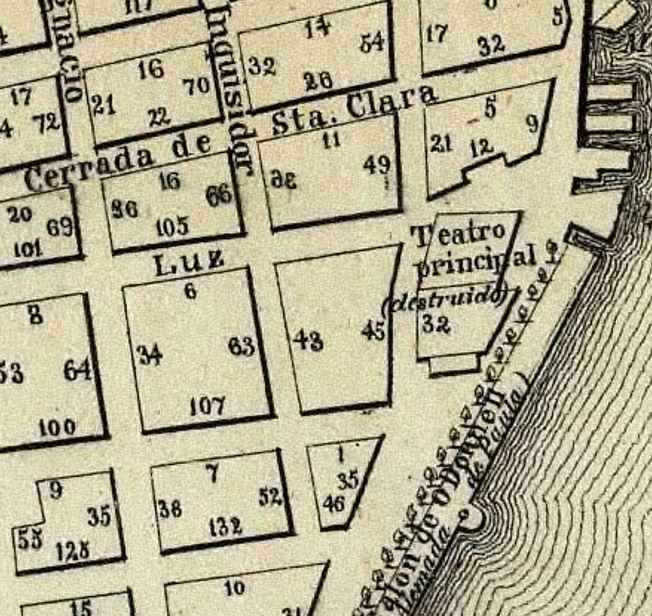
Partial 1853 Havana map Coliseo of Havana.

The Coliseum was the first building erected in Havana to provide theatrical performances, it opened its doors on January 20, 1775. It was located in front of the Alameda de Paula between Calles Acosta, Oficios, and Luz, in Old Havana. Built between 1773 and 1775, the initiative for the creation of the theater came from the Marquis de la Torre, who managed to gather on July 2, 1773, the most important merchants and the main personalities of the city with the aim of raising funds for the construction of the building. Shortly after, work began on the masonry and wood building. It was directed by the Havana architect Antonio Fernández de Trebejos y Zaldívar; in the year 1775 and it was announced that on the 20th of that same year, the performance of comedies would begin in the new Coliseum.

== See also ==
- Paseo del Prado, Havana
- Paseo de Tacón
- Iglesia de San Francisco de Paula, Havana
- Palacio de los Capitanes Generales
- Palacio del Segundo Cabo
- Cuartel de Milicias, Havana

== Gallery ==
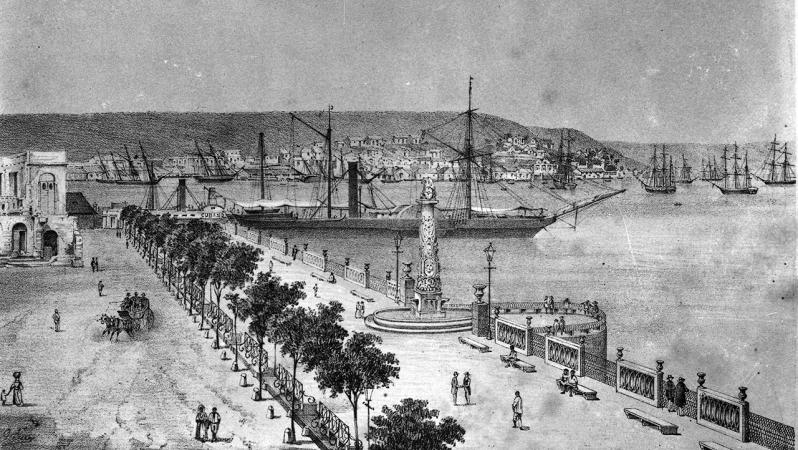
La Alameda de Paula, Havana

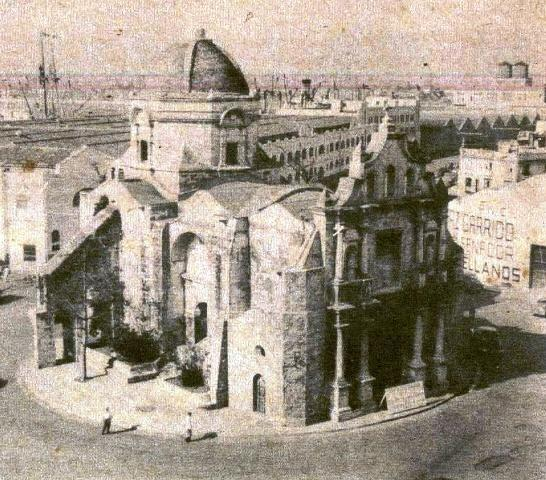

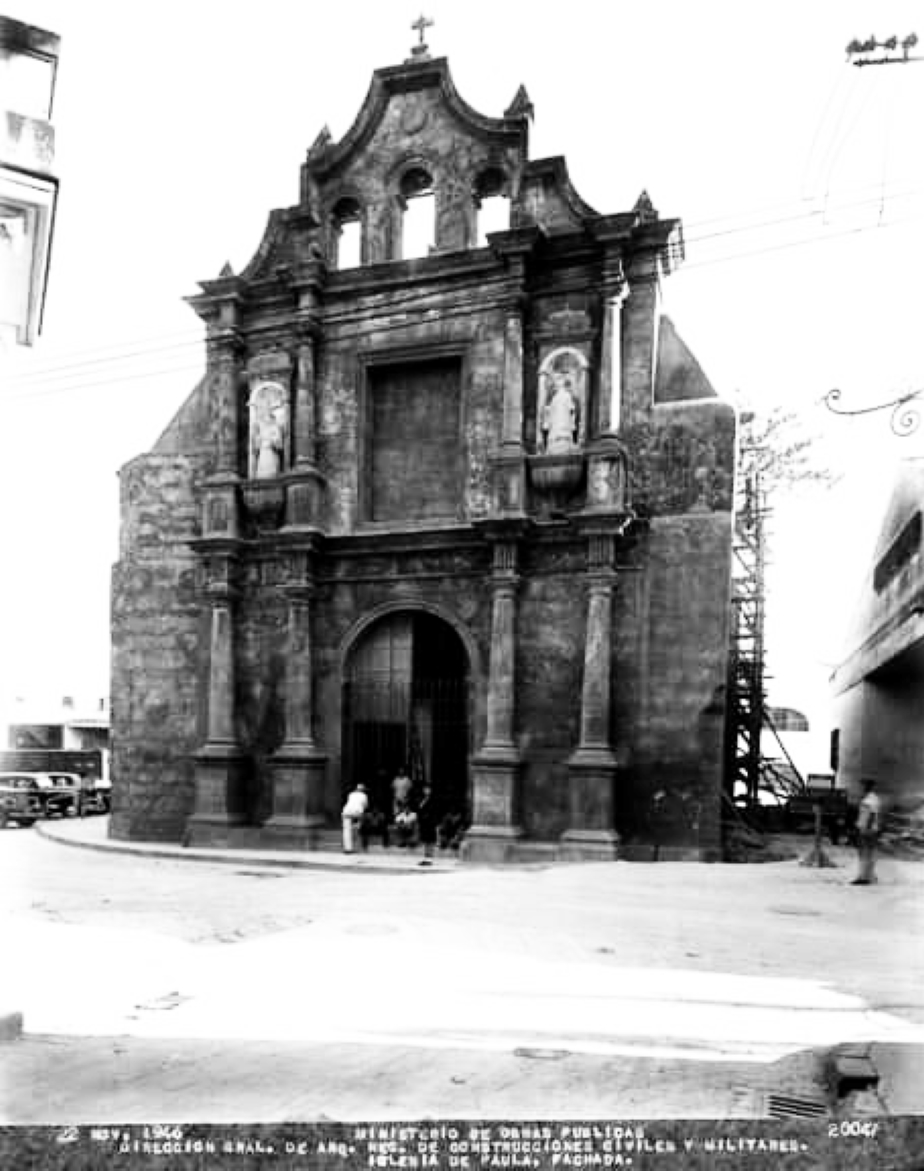

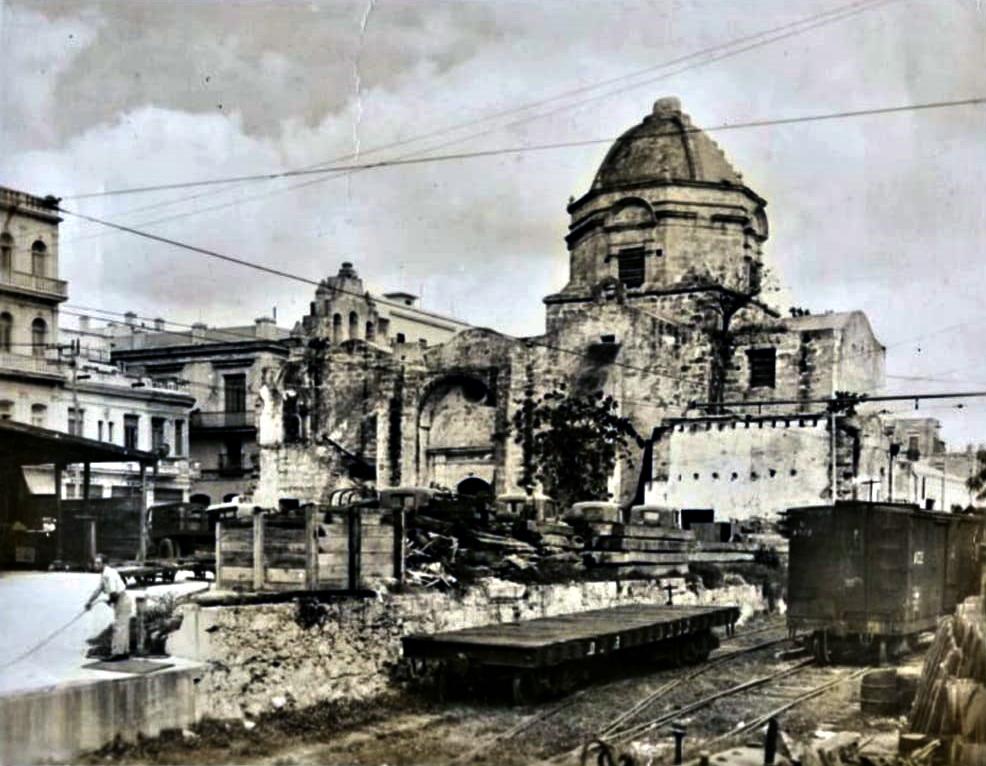
Ministerio de Obras Públicas, Taller fotográfico_2 March, 1946
