= Fashion of George Washington =

George Washington, the first president of the United States, had a collection of fashion, from suits he wore during his first inauguration to uniforms he wore during the American Revolutionary War. One of his most famous suits is a black velvet suit that he wore during his presidency; the suit is best known from the depiction of it in Gilbert Stuart's 1796 Lansdowne Portrait. Washington wore a blue-and-buff uniform during the American Revolutionary War, although the original suit was destroyed due to weather and battles. However, Washington later ordered a new one with some slight upgrades. Washington used fashion to build his identity, and these outfits later became national symbols.

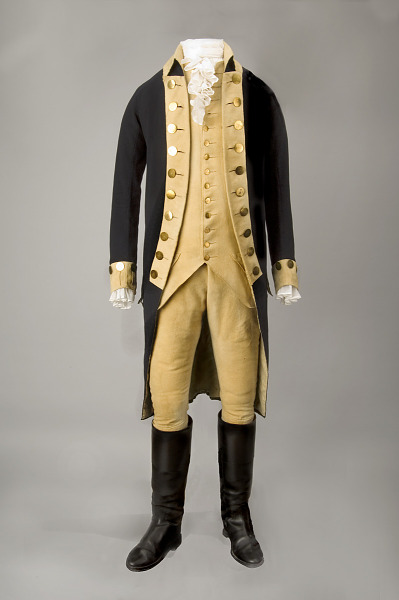
An image of the blue-and-buff uniform in question

== Uniforms ==
=== Blue-and-buff uniform ===
Washington wore a blue-and-buff uniform during active service in the American Revolutionary War; however, the suit was damaged by harsh weather and battles. Washington ordered a new, slightly upgraded version of the suit, which had yellow buttons and a white collar. In 1798, during the Whiskey Rebellion, Washington wore this suit when reviewing soldiers. When he was serving at the Second Continental Congress, Washington invented the look of the blue and buff colors the uniform had, which are now used as the pattern for the U.S. Army uniforms.

=== Blue trimmed with buff uniform ===
This uniform is famous, as it is the outfit Washington is depicted wearing in Charles Willson Peale's Washington at Princeton. Alongside the uniform, Washington wore two epaulets on each shoulder; they were made of gold with a gold lace and a gold fringe.

== Suits ==
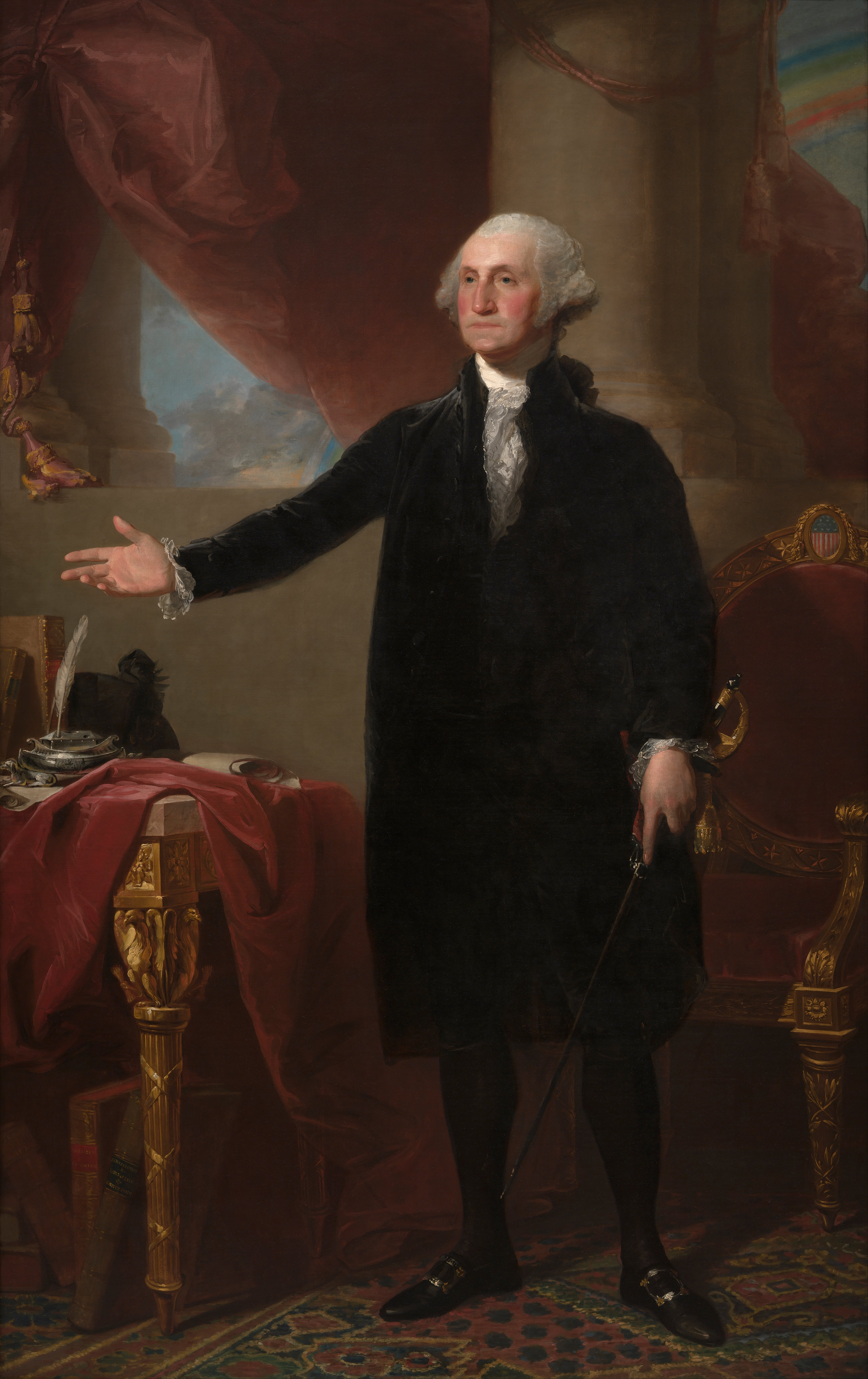
Washington can be seen wearing the black velvet suit in Gilbert Stuart's 1796 Lansdowne Portrait

=== Black velvet suit ===
Washington is known historically for wearing a black velvet suit in many paintings, such as the Lansdowne Portrait or George Washington. Washington often appeared in the suit as his formal presidential attire, alongside black shoes, black socks, and a white shirt. It has been said that Washington wore the suit at his second inauguration in 1793, although it's unknown, as Washington had many other suits he could've wore.

The Mount Vernon Ladies' Association has preserved pieces of the suit, including buttons that were once a part of the suit. The suit, along with other clothing of Washington's, was passed down to Martha Washington's grandson, George Washington Parke Custis, with whom his children played dress-up with. Although Washington was painted in his uniform a lot, in the later years artists such as Gilbert Stuart would start to paint him wearing the black velvet suit in paintings like the Lansdowne Portrait. It showcased his switch from being a military general to president of the United States.

=== Inaugural coat ===
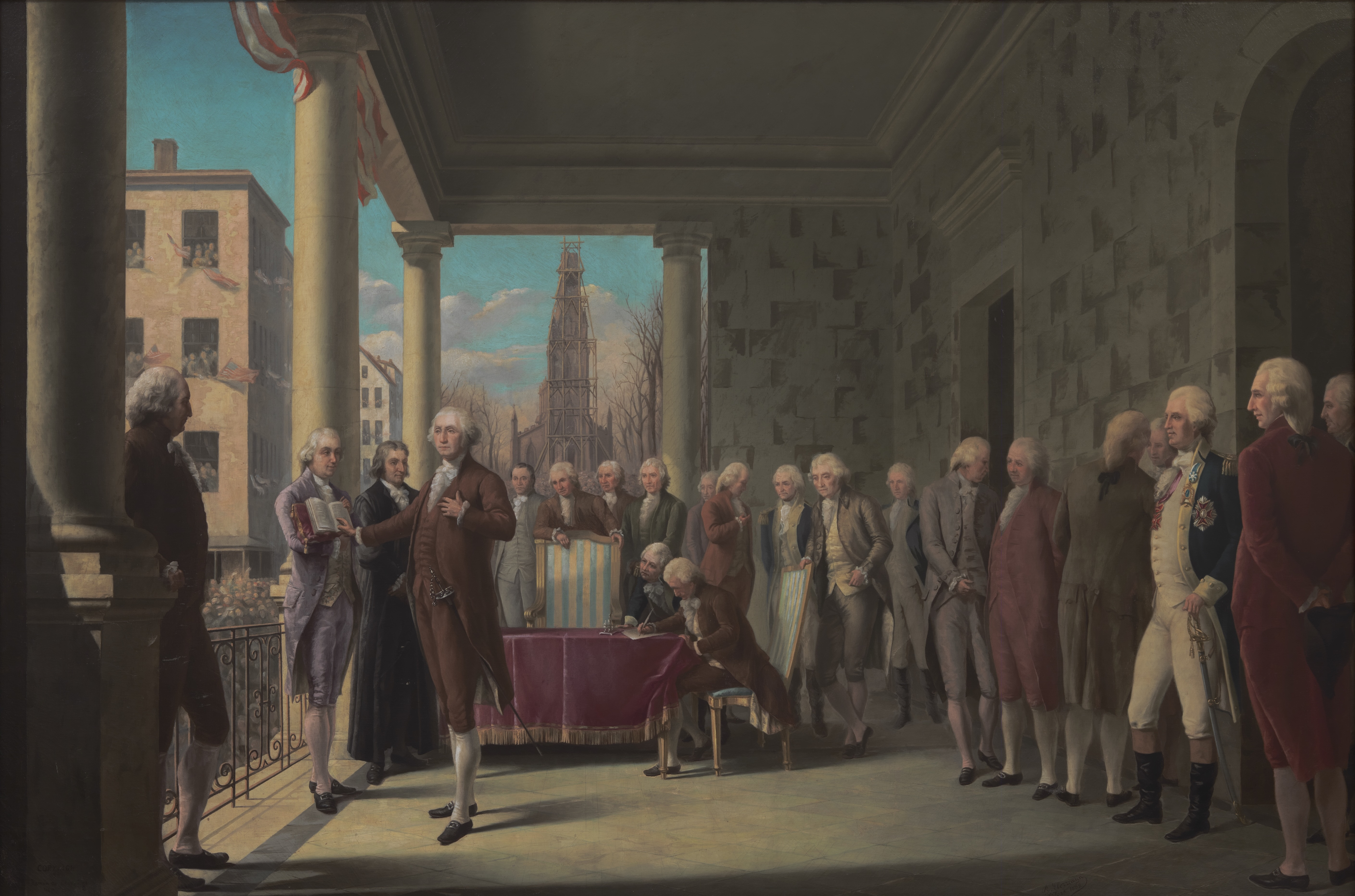
As Washington is swore into office, he is wearing the inaugural coat.

Washington was influenced by an unnamed Philadelphia mechanic in an article by The Federal Gazette during the preparation for his first inauguration. It promoted the idea of wearing domestically produced clothing to American statesmen. Washington commissioned a suit made out of American wool. It was a three-piece ensemble with a frock coat, a waistcoat and breeches.

The Hartford Woolen Manufactory had just started to produce high-quality woolen fabric. Washington wanted to support the American industry, so he went through a process that ensured he got the cloth that met his qualifications. His friend Henry Knox helped in getting this cloth from Connecticut to Washington's Mount Vernon. Washington wore the coat during his first inauguration.

=== Golden suit ===
Washington had a "golden suit" that is famous for him wearing it to his 1789 inauguration ball. In 2026, it was found that the golden suit could have actually been a plum color rather than gold. It was found when scientists used Direct Analysis in Real Time Mass Spectrometry (DART-MS) to reveal the natural dyes inside the fibers; it allowed them to compare other elements of different dyes.
