= Lansdowne Portrait =

1796 painting by Gilbert Stuart

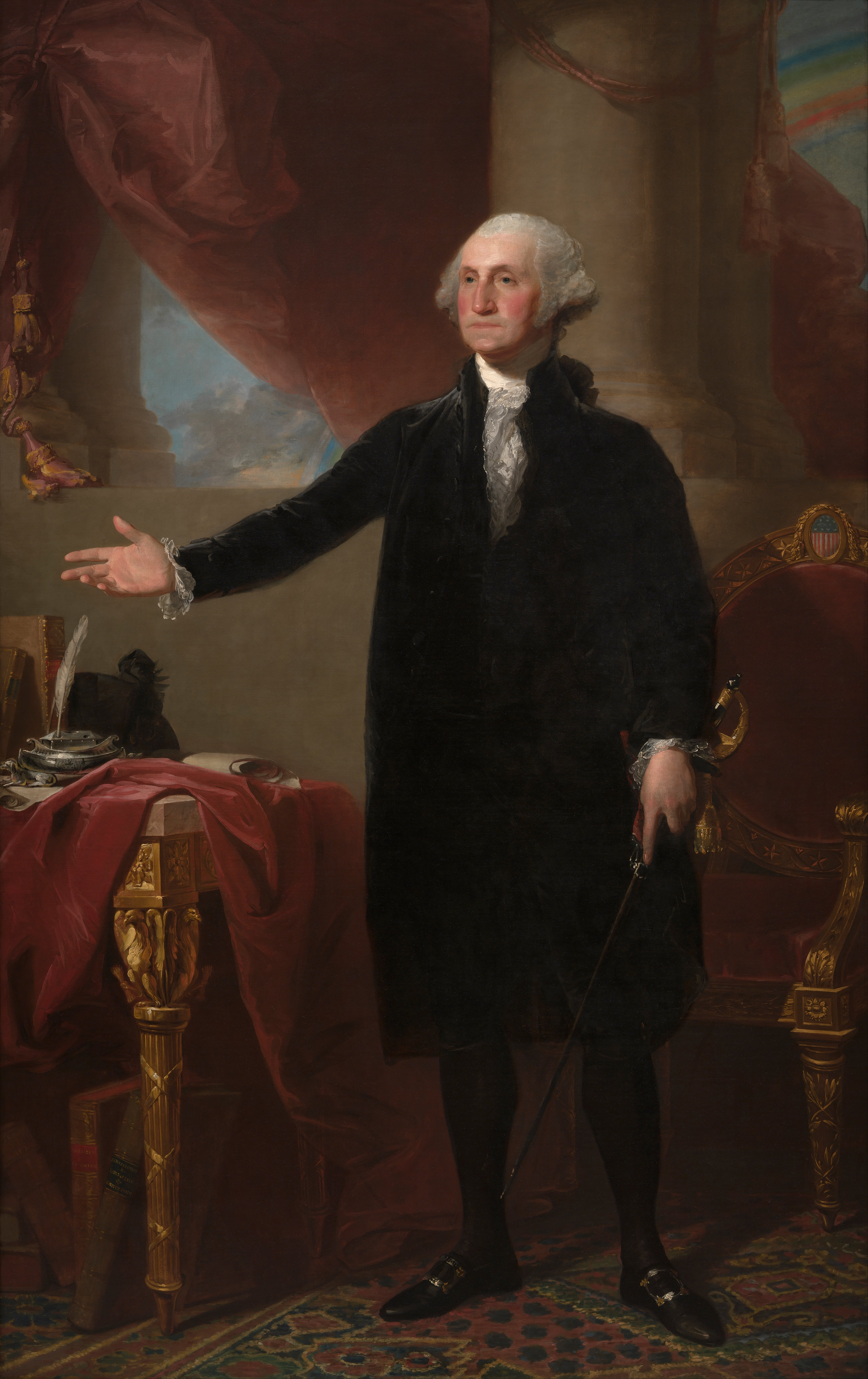
- Artist: Gilbert Stuart
- Year: 1796; 230 years ago
- Medium: Oil on canvas
- Dimensions: 247.6 cm × 158.7 cm (97.5 in × 62.5 in)
- Location: National Portrait Gallery, Washington, D.C.

The Lansdowne Portrait is an iconic life-size portrait of George Washington painted by Gilbert Stuart in 1796. It depicts the 64-year-old president of the United States during his final year in office. The portrait was a gift to former British Prime Minister William Petty, 1st Marquess of Lansdowne, and spent more than 170 years in England.

Stuart painted three replicas of the Lansdowne, and five portraits that were closely related to it. His most famous replica has hung in the East Room of the White House since 1800. Numerous other artists also painted copies.

First Lady Dolley Madison, George Washington Parke Custis, Paul Jennings, the president’s steward Jean-Pierre Sioussat and Gardener Thomas McGrath saved the White House replica from being destroyed in the August 24, 1814, Burning of Washington, D.C. by the British.

In 2001, to preclude the original Lansdowne Portrait's imminent sale at auction by Sotheby's New York, the National Portrait Gallery in Washington, D.C. purchased it for $20 million with donations from the Donald W. Reynolds Foundation.

== Jay Treaty ==
The Lansdowne Portrait likely (and fancifully) depicts President Washington's December 7, 1795, annual address to the Fourth U.S. Congress. The highly unpopular Jay Treaty, settling claims between the United States and Great Britain left over from the Revolutionary War, had been presented to the U.S. Senate for approval earlier in the year. The Senate held a special session to debate the treaty in June, at which opposition to it had been fierce. Only two-thirds of the 30 senators (the minimum required under the U.S. Constitution) approved the treaty in mid-August, and Washington, who strongly supported the treaty, signed it in late August. In his annual address, delivered to Congress on opening day of its next session, the President acknowledged the struggle over the Jay Treaty, and called for unity. There was lingering resentment in the House of Representatives, which expressed its displeasure by declining to appropriate funding for the treaty's implementation until April 1796.

In England, the Lansdowne Portrait was celebrated as Washington's endorsement of the Jay Treaty:

The portrait presented by the President [sic] to the Marquis of Lansdowne is one of the finest pictures we have seen since the death of Reynolds. The dress he wears is plain black velvet; he has his sword on, upon the hilt of which one hand rests while the other is extended, as the figure is standing and addressing the Hall of Assembly. The point of time is that when he recommended inviolable union between America and Great Britain.

Washington's December 7, 1795, address was the last that he delivered to Congress in person. The following year the President published his Farewell Address in the newspapers, rather than delivering it to Congress.

== Gilbert Stuart ==
Gilbert Stuart and his family were Loyalists, and moved from Rhode Island to Canada early in the Revolutionary War. Stuart himself lived and painted in London from 1775 to 1787, and in Dublin from 1787 to 1793. Following almost eighteen years abroad, the artist returned to the United States in early 1793.

Lord Lansdowne – who as British Prime Minister had secured a peaceful end to the War – commissioned Stuart to paint a portrait of George Washington. Lansdowne may have placed the order prior to the artist's 1793 departure for the United States. Stuart lived and worked in New York City for a year and a half before moving to Philadelphia in November 1794. He informed his uncle in Philadelphia of his upcoming arrival: "The object of my journey is only to secure a picture of the President, & finish yours."

Philadelphia served as the temporary national capital from 1790 to 1800 – while Washington, D.C. was under construction. Stuart was introduced to the President in December 1794, at one of Mrs. Washington's Friday evening "drawingrooms." But it was not until the following fall that Washington granted him a sitting. Meanwhile, Stuart gathered orders for portraits—among his papers is a document titled: "A list of gentlemen who are to have copies of the portrait of the President of the United States." and dated: "Philadelphia. April 20th, 1795." Lord Lansdowne's name was third on the list of thirty-two subscribers. (Note: In a September 25, 2014 lecture, Ellen G. Miles, Curator Emerita of the National Portrait Gallery, noted that others on Stuart's list of subscribers received replicas of Washington head-and-bust portraits, but Lord Lansdowne received an original full-length portrait. She theorized that Lansdowne had ordered a standard portrait, but it was upgraded at Senator Bingham's suggestion (and expense) to an original and full-length portrait, a much more impressive gift.)

=== Sittings ===
According to Rembrandt Peale, President Washington granted a single joint sitting to Stuart and him "in the Autumn of 1795." Stuart was not wholly satisfied with the resulting head-and-bust portrait, but still painted between twelve and sixteen replicas of it. Now known as the "Vaughan-style" portraits, the original of these is in the National Gallery of Art.

While visiting London a decade earlier, Senator William Bingham of Pennsylvania and his wife, Anne Willing Bingham, had sat for a family portrait by Stuart (unlocated). The artist seems to have approached Mrs. Bingham for assistance in getting the President to grant him a sitting for the full-length portrait:

Mr. Stuart, Chestnut Street.

Sir

— I am under promise to Mrs. Bingham to set for you to-morrow at nine o'clock, and wishing to know if it be convenient to you that I should do so, whether it shall be at your own house (as she talked of the State House) I send this note to you to ask information.

I am Sir, Your

obedient Serv^{t}

Ge^{o}.

WASHINGTON.

Monday Evening, 11th Ap^{r} 1796.

According to Rembrandt Peale, this was the only sitting Washington granted for the Lansdowne Portrait. It took place at Stuart's studio (and lodgings) in the William Moore Smith house, at the southeast corner of 5th & Chestnut Streets. With severely limited time, Stuart was forced to concentrate on the President's head and face. There are multiple claims as to who posed for the body of the figure, including his landlord, Smith. (Note: In "Wash" Custis's description of Washington's annual address to Congress (either 1794 or 1795, based on Thomas Jefferson's presence), he wrote: "Washington was dressed precisely as Stuart has painted him in Lord Lansdowne's full-length portrait—" and then proceeded to give a detailed description. On the portrait: "The defect in the full-length is in the limbs. For the figure, a man named Smith, with whom Stuart boarded, stood—a smaller man than Washington; and the hands were painted from a wax cast of Stuart's own hand, which was much smaller than Washington's." On the mouth: "Washington, at the time Stuart painted his portrait, had a set of sea-horse ivory teeth. These, just made, were too large and clumsy, and gave that peculiar appearance of the mouth seen in Stuart's picture.")

Stuart began the portrait in Philadelphia and completed it in Germantown, then some 8 miles (13 km) outside the city limits. To avoid distractions, the artist rented a Germantown house in Summer 1796 and set up a studio on the second floor of its stable. The Binghams had enjoyed Lord Lansdowne's hospitality in London, and persuaded Stuart to allow them to pay for the portrait. Stuart completed the Lansdowne portrait by the fall of 1796, and Senator Bingham paid his fee of $1,000. Bingham had an ornate frame made for the portrait, and arranged for it to be shipped to England in late November. Lord Lansdowne had received the portrait by March 5, 1797, when he mentioned it in a letter. Lansdowne's letter of thanks to Mrs. Bingham survives, but is undated:

A very fine portrait of the greatest man living in a magnificent frame found its way into my hall, with no one thing left for me to do regarding it, except to thank the amiable donor of it. It is universally approv'd and admir'd, and I see with satisfaction, that there is no one who does not turn away from every thing else, to pay their homage to General Washington. Among many circumstances which contribute to enhance the value of it, I shall always consider the quarter from whence it comes as most flattering, & I look forward with the greatest pleasure to the time of shewing you and Mr. Bingham where I have plac'd it.

=== Replicas ===
Stuart's first replica of the portrait was for the Binghams (now at the Pennsylvania Academy of the Fine Arts), and would have been completed before the original left his studio in late 1796. The President and First Lady visited Germantown on January 7, 1797: "Road [rode] to German Town with Mrs. Washington to see Mr. Stuarts paintings." The Bingham replica was still in the studio on July 27, 1797, when Robert Gilmor Jr. viewed it. The William Kerin Constable replica (now at the Brooklyn Museum) was completed that same month. The Gardiner Baker replica (now at the White House) is presumed to have been the painting commissioned by Charles Cotesworth Pinckney in September 1796, likely as a diplomatic gift to France. (Note: Art historian Ellen G. Miles has a theory as to why Charles Cotesworth Pinckney commissioned and paid for a replica of the Lansdowne portrait, but never retrieved it from Gilbert Stuart's studio. James Monroe was Minister to France in 1795, when the Jay Treaty was signed. France was then at war with Great Britain, and despite his best efforts, Monroe could not convince the French government that this was a benign treaty and would not affect Franco-American relations. President Washington recalled Monroe, and nominated Pinckney as his successor. Pinckney was confirmed by the U.S. Senate in September 1796, and arrived in Paris in November. The French Directory refused to accept Pinckney's credentials, and negotiations between the countries broke down when French officials demanded a substantial bribe before they would do so, in what became known as the XYZ Affair. Miles's theory is that the Pinckney replica of the Lansdowne portrait was intended as a diplomatic gift from the U.S. to France. Pinckney's deliberate humiliation by the Directory and the suspension of diplomatic relations between the countries (for nearly 5 years) caused those plans (and the portrait) to be abandoned. Supporting evidence for the diplomatic gift theory is that Pinckney later sought reimbursement from Secretary of State Timothy Pickering for the $500 that he had paid Stuart for the portrait.) Pinckney paid for but never retrieved his replica from Stuart's studio, and the artist seems to have resold the portrait to Gardiner Baker by December 1797.

== Provenance ==
Most of the owners of the Lansdowne Portrait have been Britons, although it spent 35 years owned by American expatriates living in England, and 48 years owned by the British-citizen descendants of American expatriates.

After the death of Lord Lansdowne, his pictures were sold by auction. The Washington was purchased by Samuel Williams, an English [sic] merchant, for $2,000. Williams subsequently became insolvent, and his creditors disposed of the Washington by a lottery. Forty tickets were sold, at fifty guineas each. The picture fell to Mr. J. Delaware Lewis, a nephew of Mr. William D. Lewis, of Philadelphia. But few Americans had ever seen the picture, and Mr. William D. Lewis, who was Chairman of the Committee on Art, obtained the loan of it from his nephew for the Centennial Exhibition. It was sent out with the loan collection from England, unpacked at Memorial Hall, and hung up in the British section before its arrival was known to the Fine Arts Committee. An effort was subsequently made to have it transferred to the American section, but it was unsuccessful. At the close of the Exhibition, it was returned to its owner in England.

=== Chronology ===
- 1796 – Painted by Gilbert Stuart.
- 1797 – Presented by Senator William Bingham and his wife Anne Willing Bingham as a gift to William Petty, the first Marquis of Lansdowne (died 1805).
- 1806 – Purchased in March, at the sale of the Marquis's estate by Samuel Williams, an American merchant living in England.
- 1827 – Purchased through lottery by John Delaware Lewis (1774–1841), an American merchant living in England.
- 1841 – Inherited by John Delaware Lewis Jr. (1828–1884), son of the American and later a British Member of Parliament
- 1876 – Exhibited at the Centennial Exposition in Philadelphia.
- 1884 – Inherited by Herman LeRoy Lewis.
- 1889 – Purchased by Archibald Philip Primrose, fifth Earl of Rosebery; by family descent to Lord Harry Dalmeny.
- 1968 – Placed by Lord Harry Dalmeny on long-term loan to the National Portrait Gallery.
- 2001 – Purchased by the National Portrait Gallery, with $20 million from The Donald W. Reynolds Foundation. The Foundation donated an additional $10 million to renovate the National Portrait Gallery and to fund a traveling exhibition of the portrait.

== Description and analysis ==
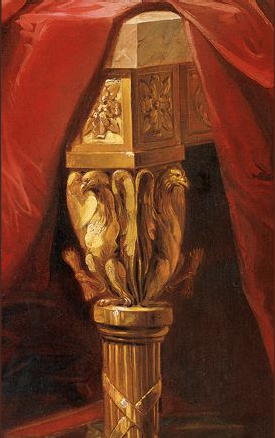
The table leg may have been inspired by a wooden ceremonial mace used by the U.S. House of Representatives (the U.S. House symbol was itself inspired by the Roman fasces). The House mace was a bundle of tied reeds topped with a bald eagle, an American symbol.

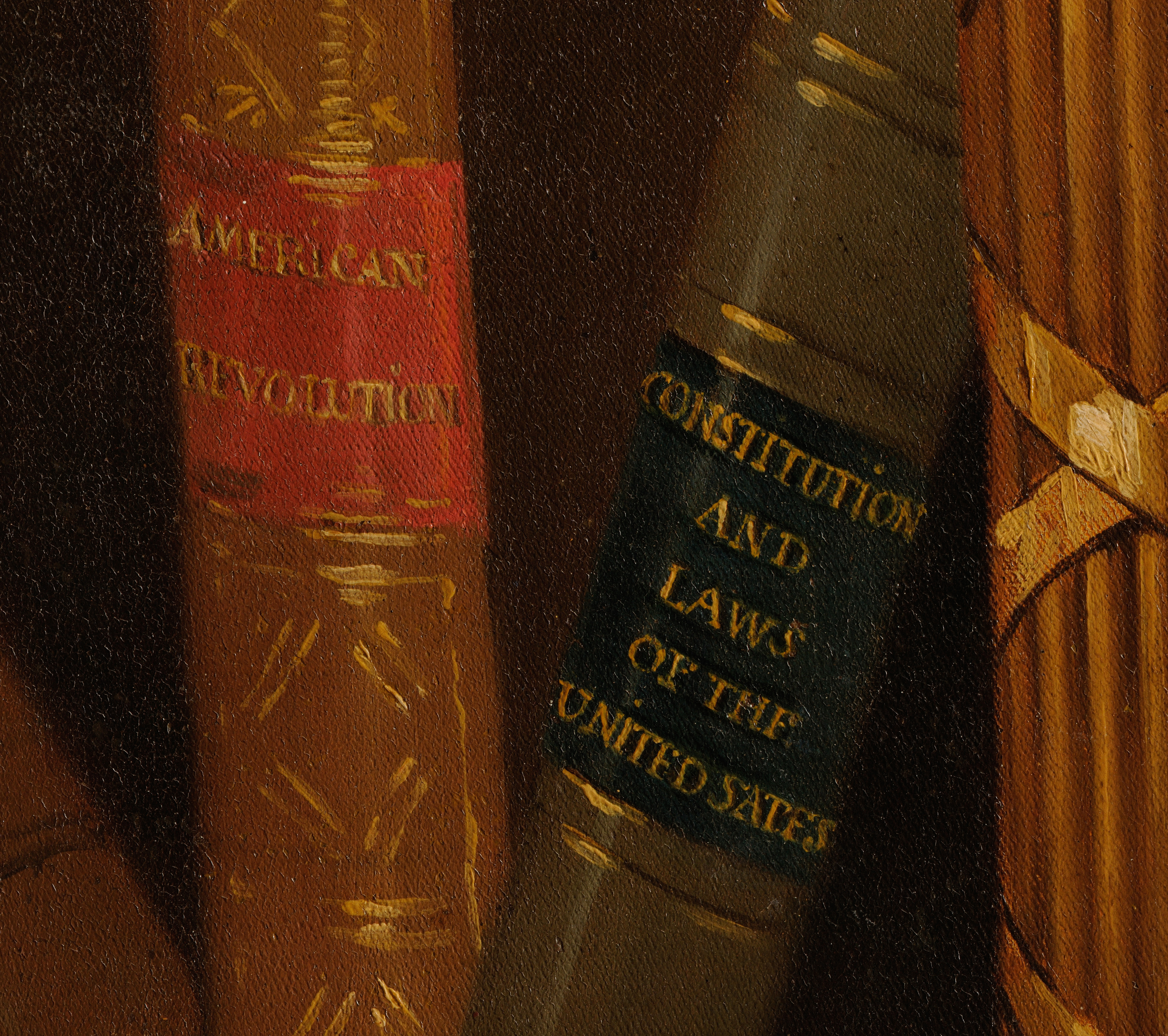
Detail of the book bindings in the White House's copy of the Lansdowne Portrait. UNITED STATES is spelled as UNITED SATES to distinguish the copy.

The painting is full of symbolism, drawn from American and ancient Roman symbols of the Roman Republic. Stuart painted Washington from life, showing him standing up, dressed in a black velvet suit with an outstretched hand held up in an oratorical manner. Behind Washington is a row of two Doric columns, with another row to the left. Wrapped around and between the columns are red tasseled drapes.

Washington's suit is plain and simple, and the sword he holds on his left side is a dress sword and not a battle sword (symbolizing a democratic form of government, rather than a monarchy or military dictatorship). In the sky, storm clouds appear on the left while a rainbow appears on the right, signifying the American Revolutionary War giving way to the peace and prosperity of the new United States after the 1783 Treaty of Paris. The medallion at the top of the chair shows the red, white, and blue colors of the American flag.

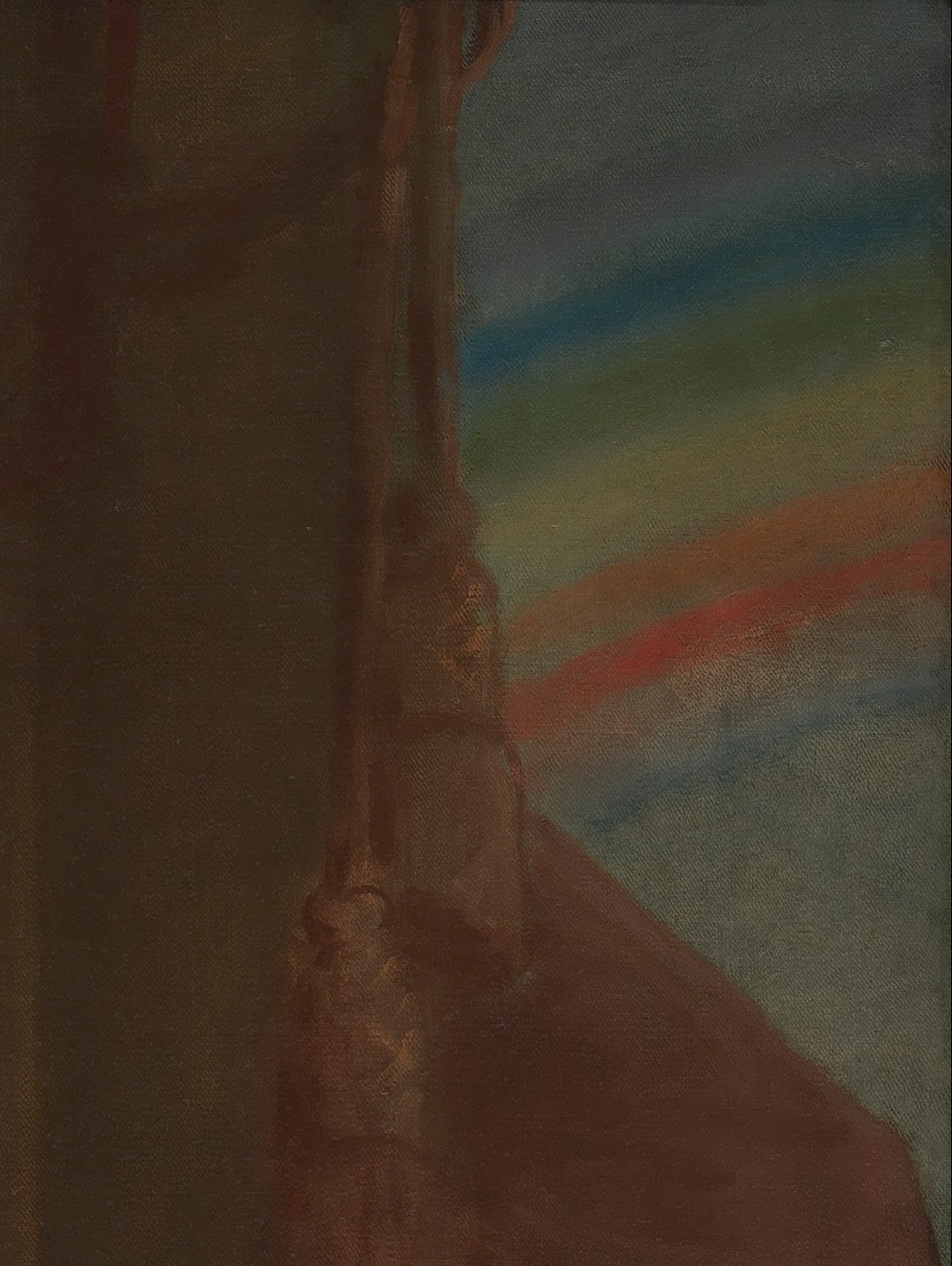
Detail of the rainbow in the Lansdowne Portrait. Note that the colors of the rainbow are reversed, similar to the secondary arc of a double rainbow but with no visible primary rainbow.

On and under the tablecloth-draped table to the left are two books: Federalist—probably a reference to the Federalist Papers—and Journal of Congress—the Congressional Record. Another five books are under the table: the three to the right are General Orders, American Revolution, and Constitutional Bylaws—symbolizing Washington's leadership as commander-in-chief of the Continental Army and president of the Constitutional Convention.

The pen and paper on the table signify the rule of law. The table's leg is carved as a fasces, a bundle of bound wooden rods that symbolized imperial power and authority in ancient Rome. On the table is a silver inkwell, emblazed with George Washington's coat of arms, which alludes to his signing of the Jay Treaty. A white quill rests upon silver dogs, ancient symbols of loyalty. Behind these on the table is the President's large black hat.

Washington's unusually clenched facial expression comes from his famous false teeth. Jean-Antoine Houdon's marble sculpture of Washington shows a more natural expression. Stuart wrote: "When I painted him [Washington], he had just had a set of false teeth inserted, which accounts for the constrained expression so noticeable about the mouth and lower part of the face ... Houdon's bust does not suffer from this defect."

== Alternate versions ==
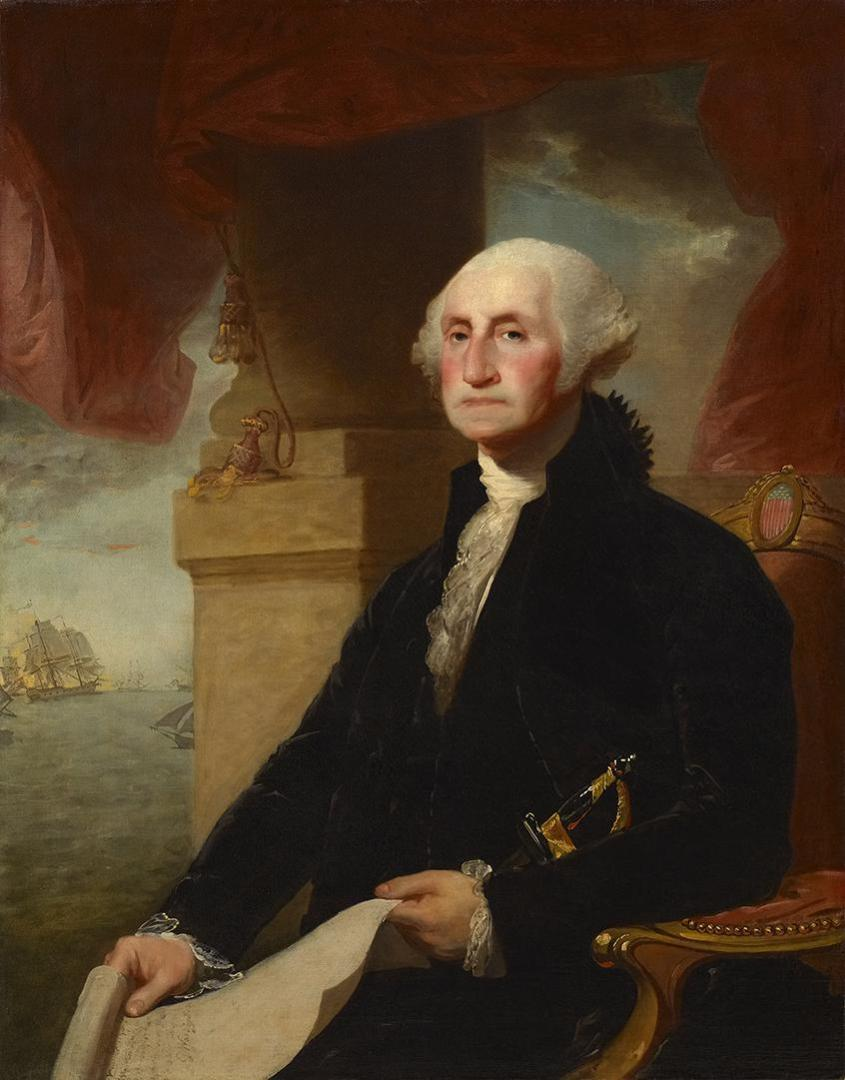
Constable-Hamilton Portrait (c. 1797) by Gilbert Stuart

=== Constable-Hamilton portrait ===
Stuart painted a 1797 seated portrait of Washington, based on the Lansdowne. William Kerin Constable, who commissioned the Lansdowne replica now at the Brooklyn Museum, also commissioned the seated version. Constable presented it to Alexander Hamilton in 1797. The portrait remained in the Hamilton family until 1896, when it was bequeathed to the Lenox Library. The Lenox Library later merged with the New York Public Library. The portrait was auctioned at Sotheby's NY, 30 November 2005, lot 3, and sold for $8,136,000. The Constable-Hamilton Portrait is now in the collection of the Crystal Bridges Museum of American Art, in Bentonville, Arkansas.

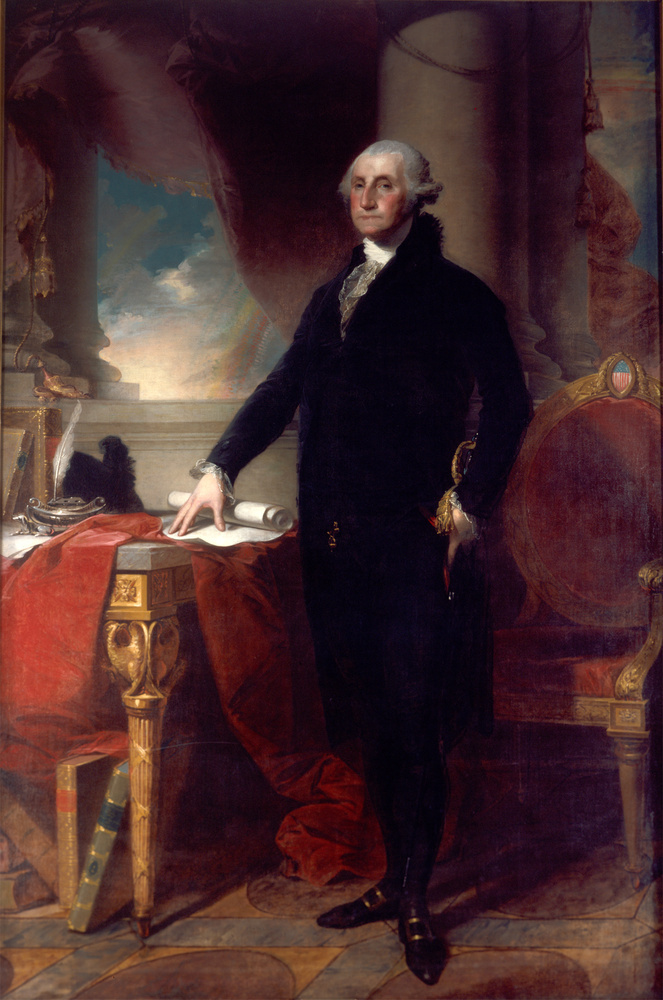
Munro-Lenox Portrait (c. 1800) by Gilbert Stuart, private collection

=== Munro-Lenox Portrait ===
Stuart made several changes for the Munro-Lenox portrait (c.1800): Washington's head is slightly turned, and his hand is on the table, rather than gesturing into the air. The President looks directly at the viewer, which makes it a more compelling image than the Lansdowne. The head appears to be based on Stuart's Athenaeum portrait (the image on the one-dollar bill). The wall behind the President is lowered, allowing for a more dramatic scene of the sun breaking through the storm clouds. Following 135 years of ownership by the New York Public Library, the Munro-Lenox portrait was deassessioned and offered for auction at Sotheby's NY in 2005. It failed to sell at auction, and was sold in a private sale for an undisclosed amount to Michael and Judy Steinhardt.

Stuart painted three full-size replicas of the Munro-Lenox Portrait, one for the Connecticut State House in Hartford; and two for Rhode Island—one for the State House in Providence, and the other for Old Colony House in Newport.

== Painted by Gilbert Stuart ==
Type	Collection	Image	Artist	Completed	Medium	Dimensions	Notes
Lansdowne type
Original	Lansdowne portrait National Portrait Gallery, Washington, D.C.		Gilbert Stuart	Fall 1796	oil on canvas	247.6 cm x 158.7 cm (97 1/2 x 62 1/2 in)	Begun April 12, 1796; Unsigned & undated Placed on long-term loan to the National Portrait Gallery, 1968; Purchased by the National Portrait Gallery, 2001
Replica	Pennsylvania Academy of the Fine Arts, Philadelphia, Pennsylvania	at far left	Gilbert Stuart	by November 1796	oil on canvas	243.8 cm x 152.4 cm (96 in x 60 in)	Commissioned by Senator William Bingham; Signed & dated: "G. Stuart, 1796"; Present in Stuart's Germantown studio, July 1797; 1811 bequest by Bingham to PAFA
Replica	Brooklyn Museum, Brooklyn, New York City		Gilbert Stuart	July 1797	oil on canvas	244.5 cm x 153 cm (96 1/4 in x 60 1/4 in)	Commissioned by William Kerin Constable. Unsigned & undated Constable paid Stuart $500 for "one [portrait] of the late President of the United States at full length." Constable's receipt from Stuart is signed and dated "Philadelphia. 13 July 1797."; 1945 museum purchase
Replica	White House, East Room, Washington, D.C.		Gilbert Stuart (and William Winstanley?) (Note: The comparably poor quality of the Lansdowne replica at the White House has led to questions and conspiracy theories about its authorship. After Stuart toured the White House with Dr. William Thornton in 1802, Thornton's wife wrote to Dolley Madison: "He [Stuart] denies most pointedly having painted the picture in the President's house, and says he told Genl: Lee that he did not paint it—but that he bargained for it." Artist William Dunlap wrote (in 1834) that William Winstanley was hired to pack the Washington portrait bought for the White House in July 1800, and substituted his own copy for Stuart's prior to its being shipped from New York City to Washington, D.C. Dunlap also reported that Winstanley had approached Stuart about putting finishing touches on his pirated Lansdowne copies, proposing that they could share the proceeds, but Stuart angrily rejected the idea. Regarding Stuart's denial of the White House Lansdowne, Ellen G. Miles writes: "The comment does suggest that Stuart did not paint the entire portrait." Gilbert Stuart (2004), p. 181, n. 23.)	by December 1797	oil on canvas	241.3 cm x 151.9 cm (95 in x 59 3/4 in)	Probably commissioned by Charles Cotesworth Pinckney, September 1796, as a diplomatic gift to France. Unsigned & undated Purchased from Stuart by Gardiner Baker for $500, by December 1797. Exhibited at Tammany Society Museum, New York City, February 1798. Purchased for the White House for $800, July 1800. Rescued by First Lady Dolley Madison prior to the August 24, 1814, burning of the White House by the British.
Constable-Hamilton type
Original	Constable-Hamilton Portrait; Crystal Bridges Museum of American Art, Bentonville, Arkansas		Gilbert Stuart	July 1797	oil on canvas	127 cm x 101.6 cm (50 in x 40 in)	Commissioned by William Kerin Constable, as a gift to Alexander Hamilton. Constable paid $250 for the "half-length" portrait. His receipt from Stuart is signed and dated "Philadelphia. 13 July 1797."; 1896 bequest to the Lenox Library (later merged with New York Public Library); Ex collection: Lenox Library; Ex collection:New York Public Library; Auctioned at Sotheby's NY, 30 November 2005, Lot 3.
Munro-Lenox type
Original	Munro-Lenox Portrait; Private collection		Gilbert Stuart	c.1800	oil on canvas	241.3 cm x 162.6 cm (95 in x 64 in)	Commissioned by Peter Jay Munro; Signed "G. St." (on table leg), undated Donated to the Lenox Library, 1870. Ex collection: Lenox Library; Ex collection: New York Public Library; Auctioned at Sotheby's NY, 30 November 2005, Lot 5.
Replica	Old State House, Connecticut State Library Museum, Hartford, Connecticut		Gilbert Stuart	April 1801	oil on canvas	240.4 cm x 146.1 cm (94 5/8 in x 57 1/2 in)	Commissioned by the Connecticut General Assembly, May 1800. Connecticut paid $600 for the portrait. The receipt, signed by Stuart and dated 4 April 1801, is in the Connecticut State Archives.
Replica	Rhode Island State House, State Reception Room, Providence, Rhode Island.		Gilbert Stuart	by October 1801	oil on canvas	(96 in x 60 in)	Rhode Island had statehouses in both Providence and Newport (until 1901). The Rhode Island General Assembly commissioned 2 copies of the Munro-Lenox portrait in 1800, one for each statehouse. The elaborate wooden frame was carved and gilded by Martin Jugiez, a Philadelphia carver. Both portraits (and their ornate frames) were transported by ship from Philadelphia, and arrived at Newport in October 1801. (Note: "The commission was at once given to Gilbert Stuart, who took pride and pleasure in painting the portraits; for which work he received $1,200. The pictures were painted in Philadelphia, where the frames were also procured at a cost of $200 each. When finished, the portraits and frames were placed in the care of Joseph Anthony & Co., of Philadelphia, by whom they were shipped to Rhode Island on board of Gibbs & Channing's sloop Eagle. The pictures were received here in October 1801.")
Replica	Old Colony House (formerly Rhode Island State House, Newport), Newport, Rhode Island		Gilbert Stuart	by October 1801	oil on canvas		Old Colony House served as a Rhode Island State House until 1901. The elaborate wooden frame was carved and gilded by Martin Jugiez, a Philadelphia carver. Arrived by ship at Newport, October 1801.

== Copies painted by other artists ==
The Lansdowne and Munro-Lenox portraits were copied many times, and reproduced in widely circulated prints. William Winstanley (1775–1806), a British landscape painter working in the United States, reportedly painted six full-size copies of the Lansdowne. During the 19th century, Jane Stuart (the artist's daughter) painted multiple copies of the Lansdowne in full and reduced sizes. Alonzo Chappel included elements of the Lansdowne in his c.1860 seated portrait of Washington (Metropolitan Museum of Art).

=== Lansdowne type ===
- The Catholic University of America, Washington, D.C., unknown artist (possibly William Winstanley), 1798 or later
- Washington and Lee University, Lexington, Virginia, unknown artist (possibly William Winstanley), 1798 or later
- Private collection (deaccessioned from the Art Institute of Chicago), unknown artist (possibly William Winstanley), 1798 or later
- Portrait of George Washington, Royal Academy of Fine Arts of San Fernando, Madrid, Spain, Giuseppe Pirovani, c.1800-1820
- New York State Capitol, Albany, New York, by Ezra Ames, 1813
- Rayburn Room, U.S. Capitol, unknown artist (possibly William Winstanley), by 1816
  - Inscription: "Presented to the Legation of the United States at Madrid by Richard W. Meade of Philadelphia, December 11th, 1818."
  - Relocated from the U.S. Embassy in Madrid to the U.S. Capitol, 1951.
- North Carolina State House, Raleigh, North Carolina, by Thomas Sully, commissioned 1816, installed 1818. Now in the House of Representatives Chamber, North Carolina State Capitol.
- Kuhl-Harrison reduced-size portrait, (36 1/4 in x 24 in), unlocated, Gilbert Stuart and Jane Stuart, by 1828
- Philadelphia Masonic Temple, Philadelphia, Pennsylvania, unknown artist, 1832
- Maryland Historical Society, Baltimore, Maryland, unknown artist, c.1830s
- Providence Athenaeum, Providence, Rhode Island, unknown Italian artist, c.1830s
- The Greenbrier, White Sulphur Springs, West Virginia, by Jane Stuart, mid-19th century
- Reduced-size portrait, Redwood Library and Athenaeum, Newport, Rhode Island, Jane Stuart, mid-19th century
- Birmingham Museum of Art, Birmingham, Alabama, by Theodore Ramos (1928–2018), 1965. On loan to American Village, Montevallo, Alabama.
- Florida Historic Capitol Museum, House of Representatives Chamber, Tallahassee, Florida, by Emmaline Buchholz.
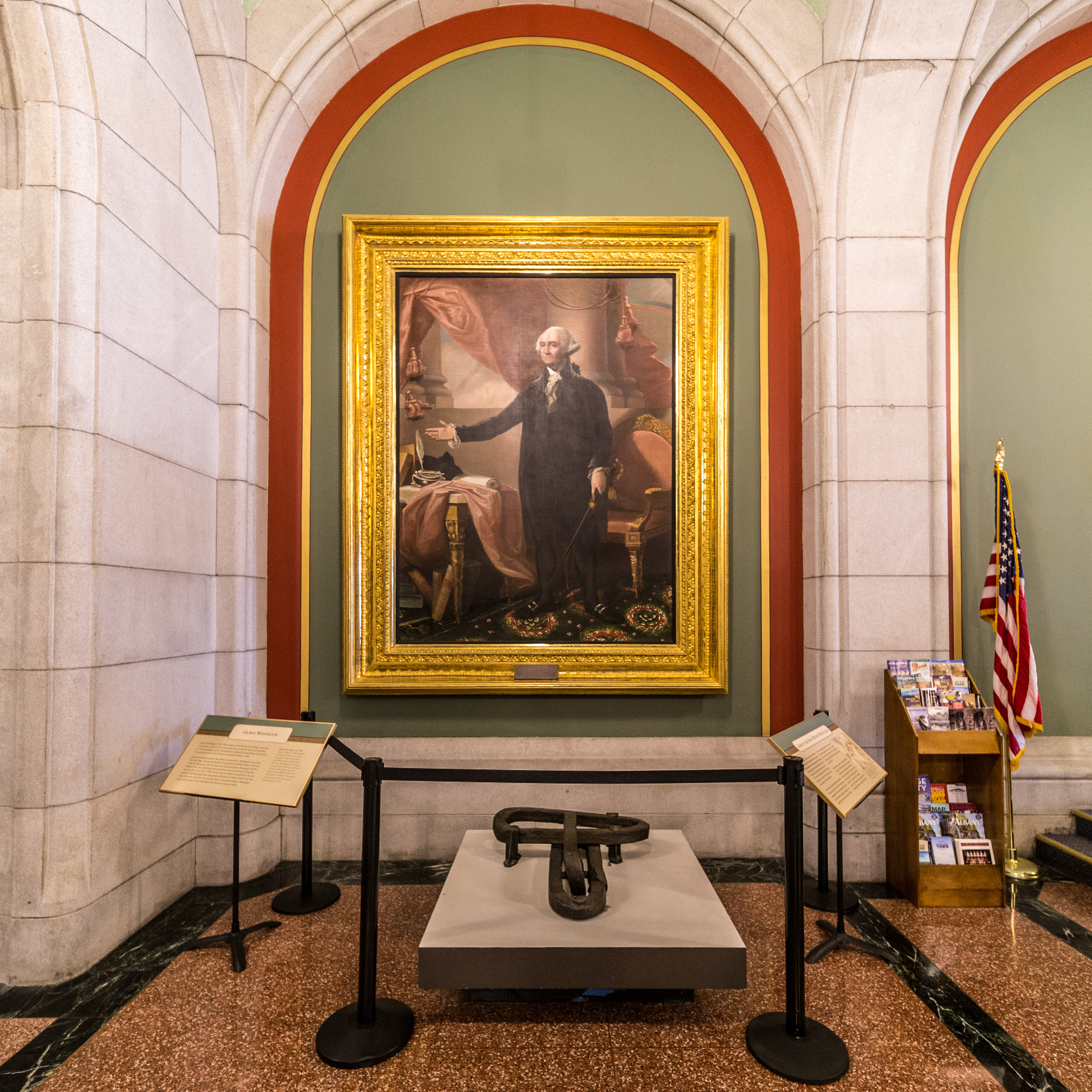
New York State Capitol, Albany, NY, Ezra Ames, 1813

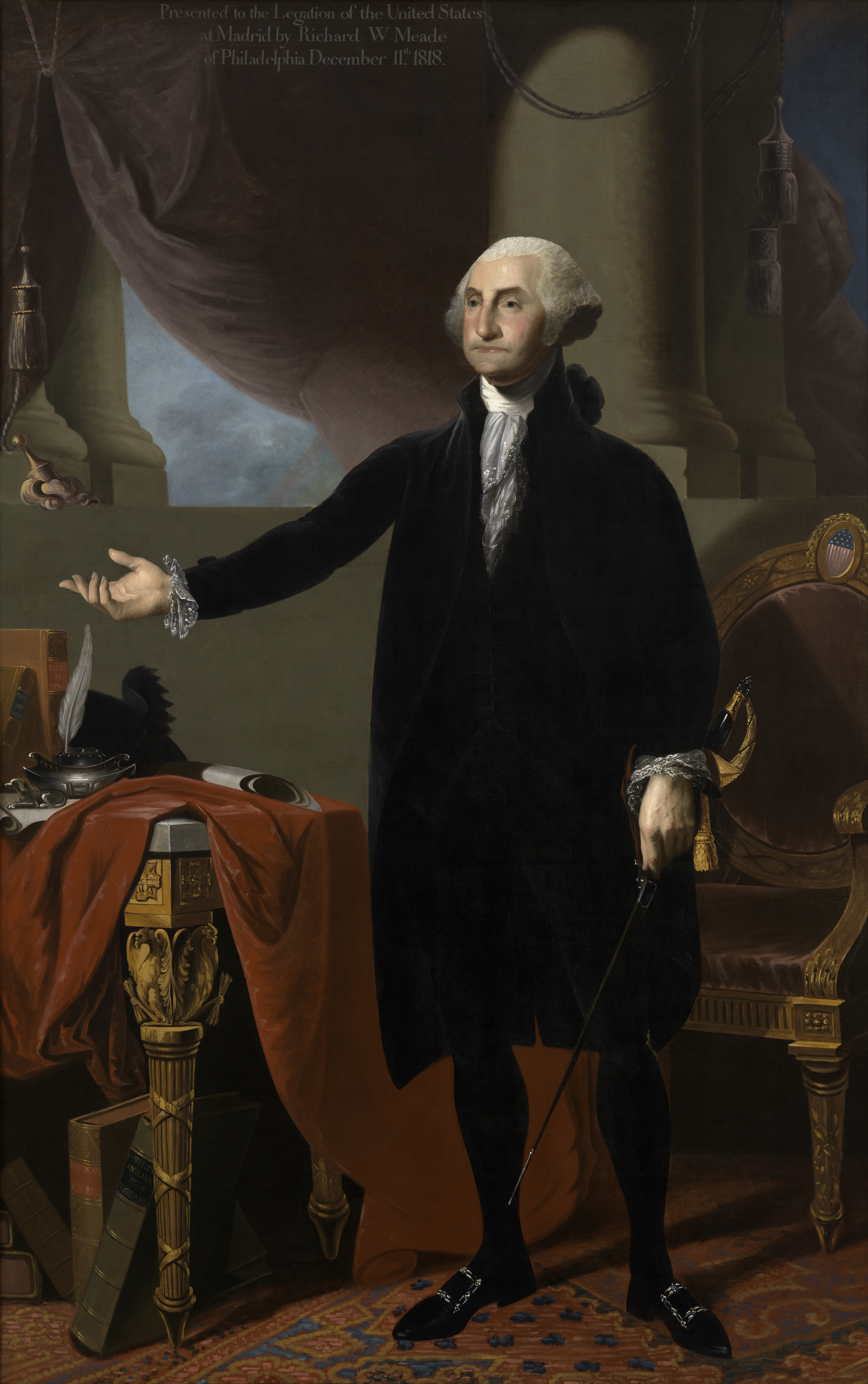
Rayburn Room, U.S. Capitol, Washington, DC, unknown artist, by 1816

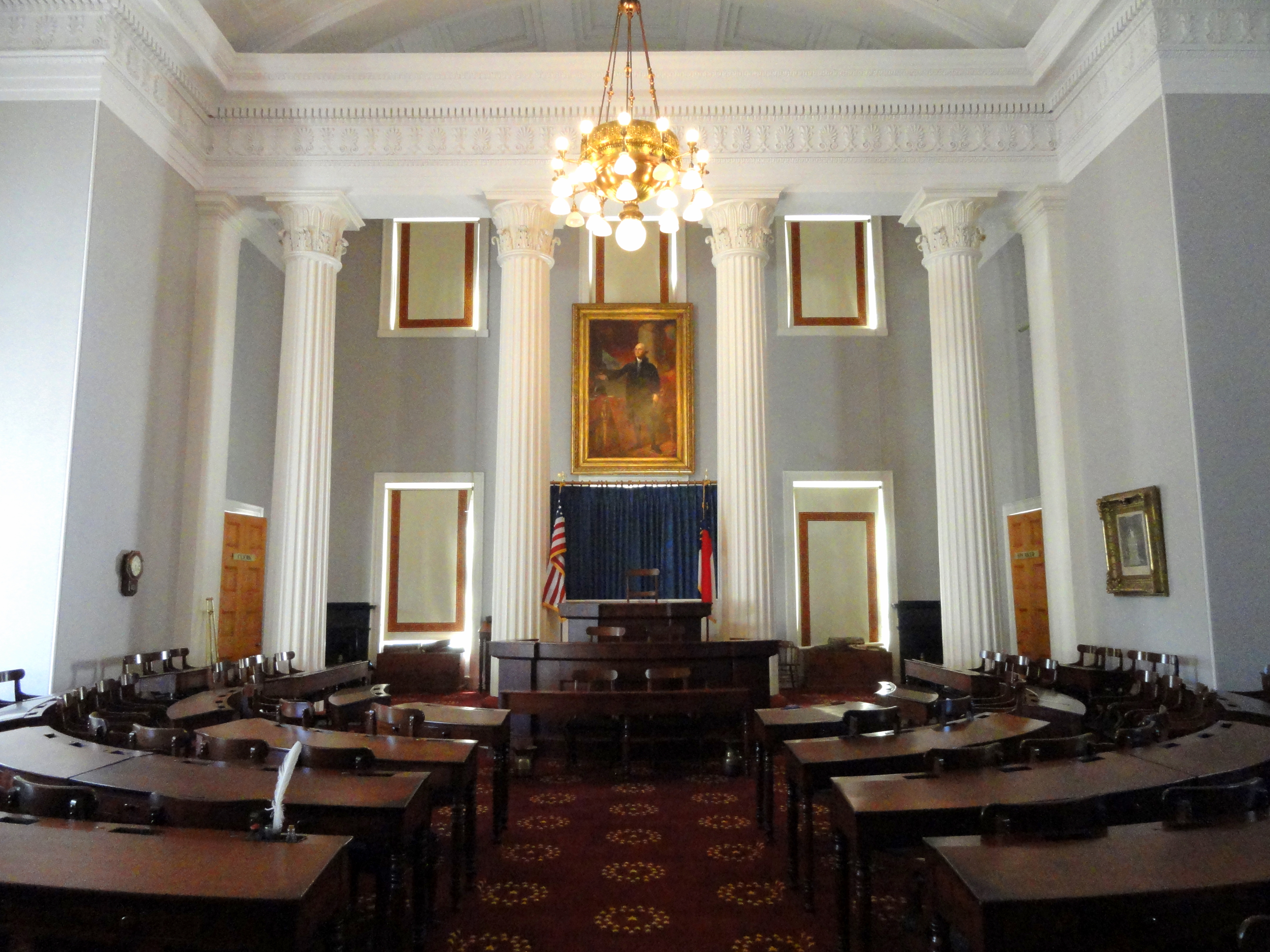
North Carolina State Capitol, Raleigh, NC, Thomas Sully, 1818

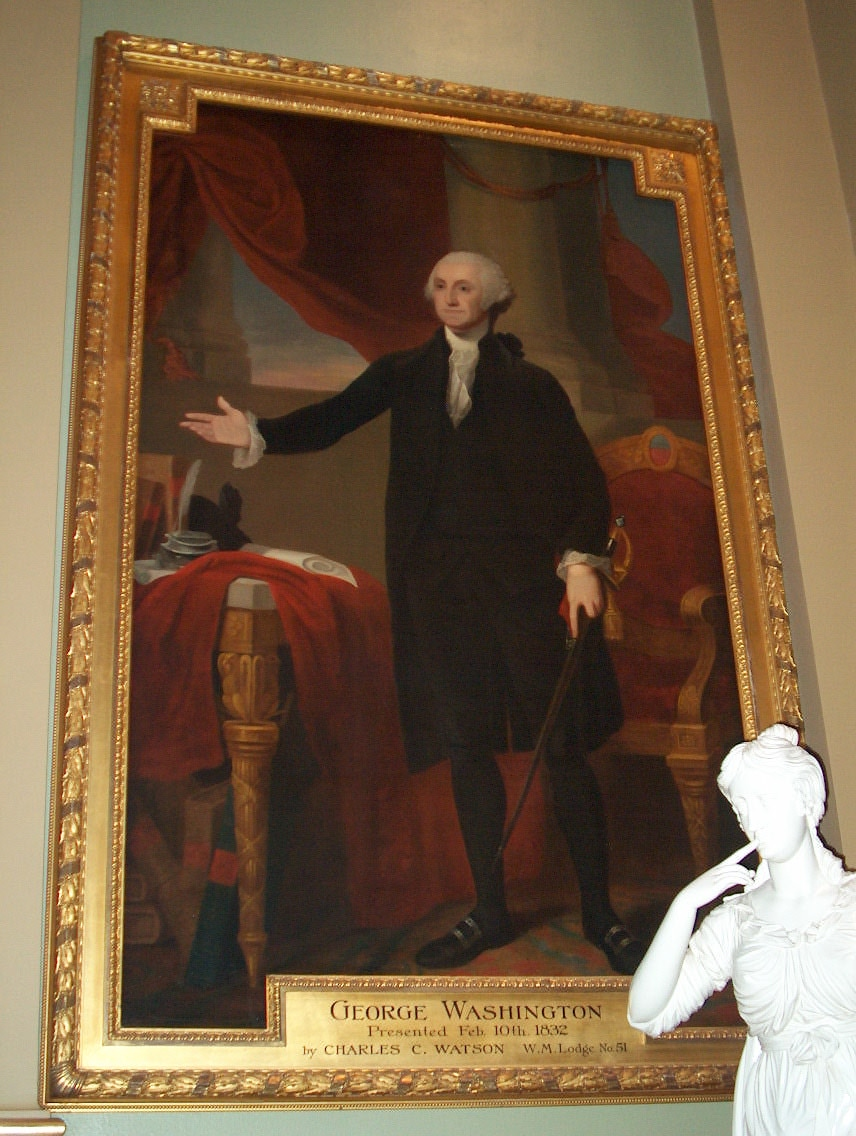
Philadelphia Masonic Temple, PA, unknown artist, 1832

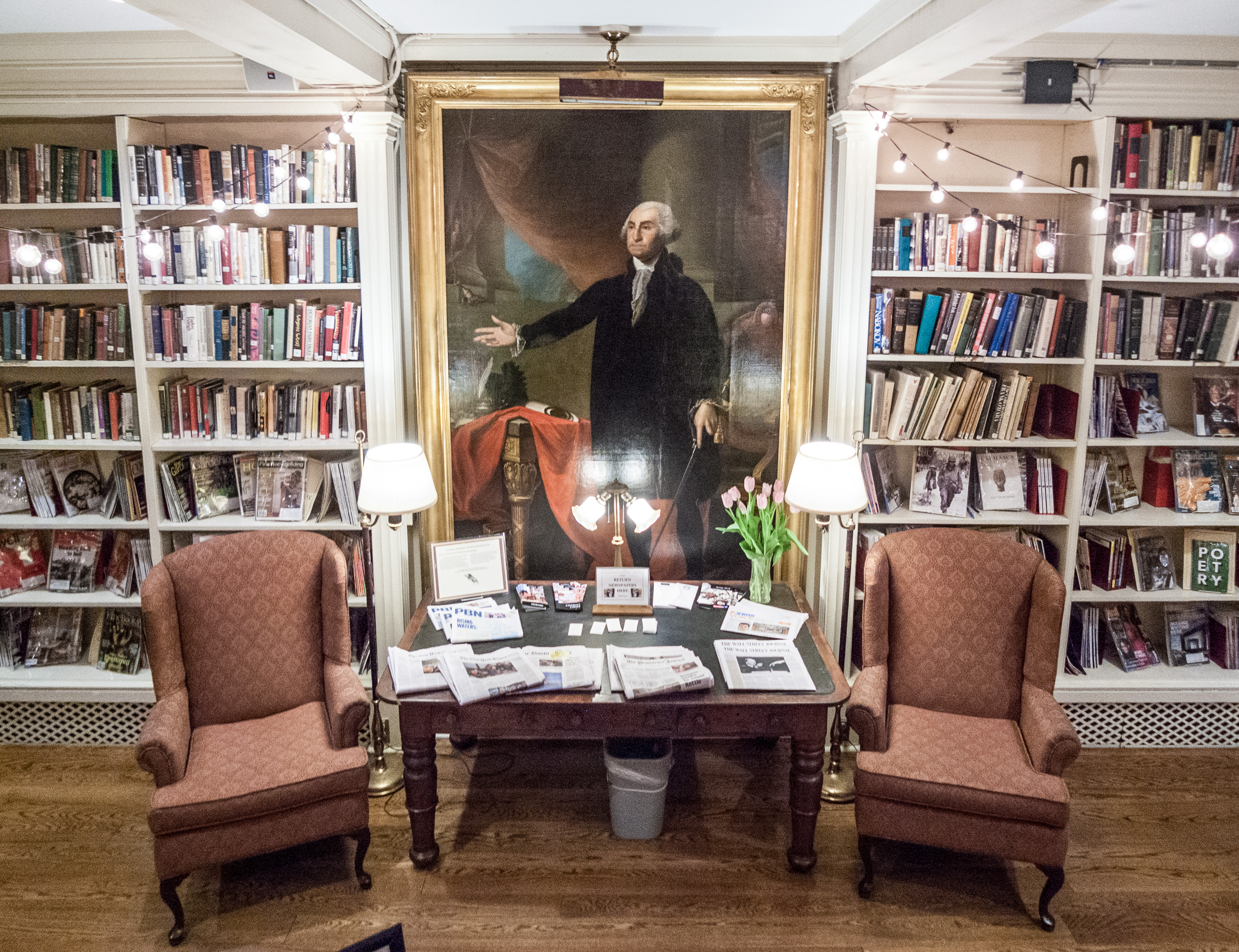
Providence Athenaeum, RI, unknown artist, 1830s

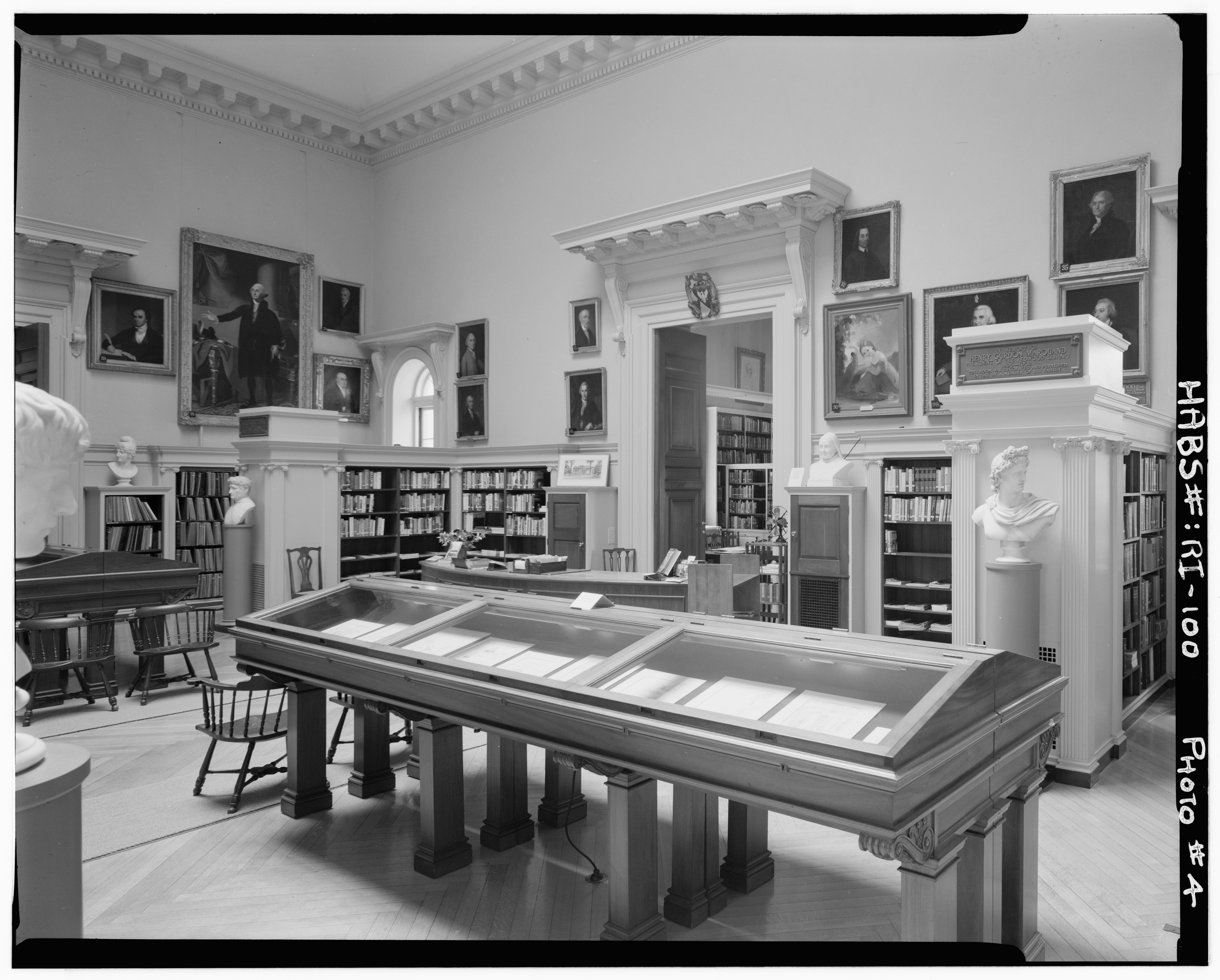
Redwood Library and Athenaeum, Newport, RI. Jane Stuart, mid-19th century

=== Munro-Lenox type ===
- Minneapolis Institute of Art, Minneapolis, Minnesota, by Thomas Sully, c. 1820
- U.S. House of Representatives Chamber, U.S. Capitol, by John Vanderlyn, 1834
- National Portrait Gallery, London, United Kingdom (on loan to Montreal Museum of Fine Arts), unknown artist (possibly William Winstanley), undated
- Old Colony History Museum, Taunton, Massachusetts, by James Sullivan Lincoln, ca 1835.
- Vermont State House, Montpelier, VT, by George Gassner (1811-1861), ca 1837. The first artwork purchased by the State of Vermont.
- Corcoran Art Gallery, Washington, D.C., by Jane Stuart, 1854.
- National Portrait Gallery, Washington, D.C. (on long-term loan), unknown artist, undated
- Fall River Public Library, Massachusetts, by Robert Spear Dunning, 1892
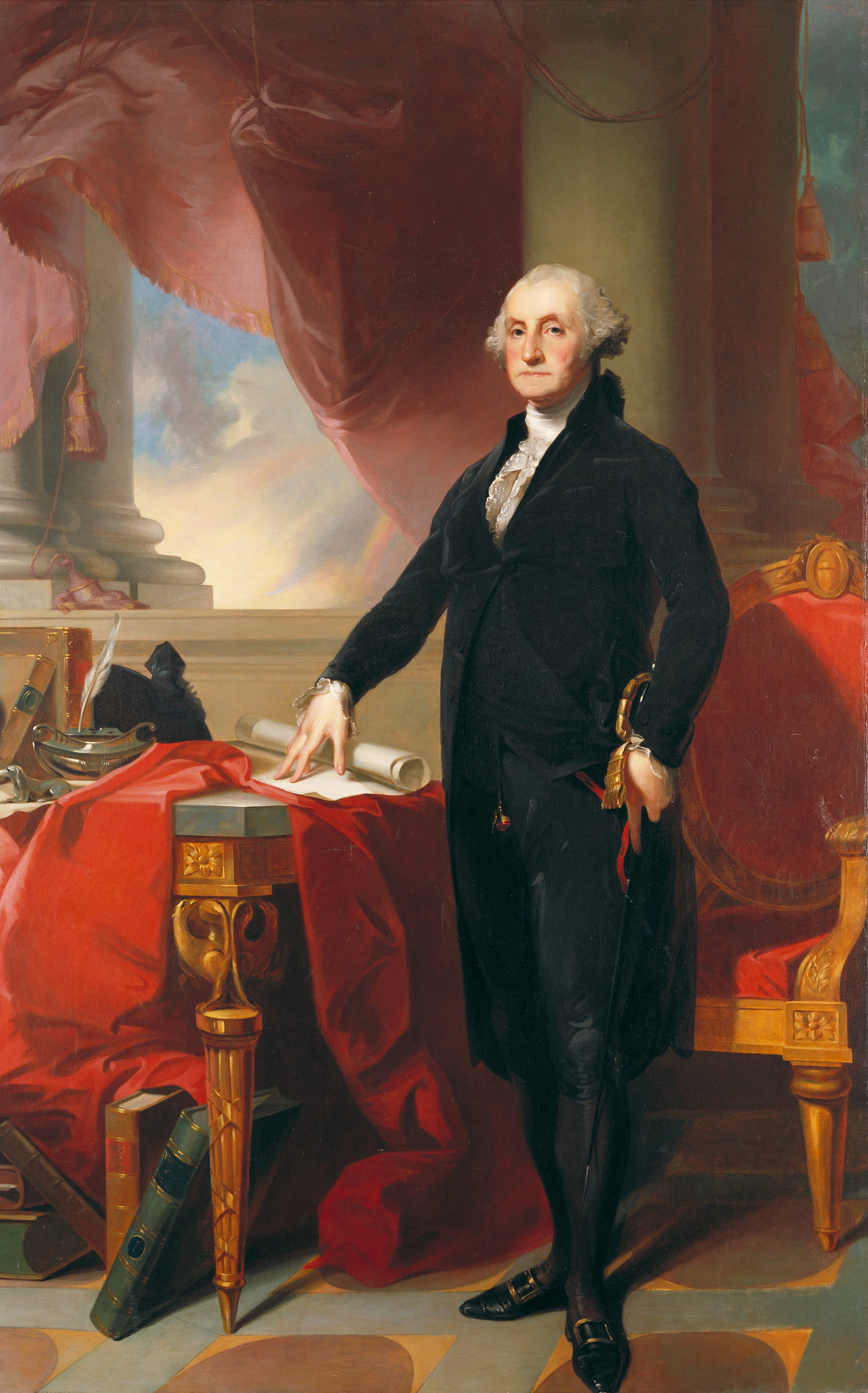
Minneapolis Institute of Art, Thomas Sully, c. 1820

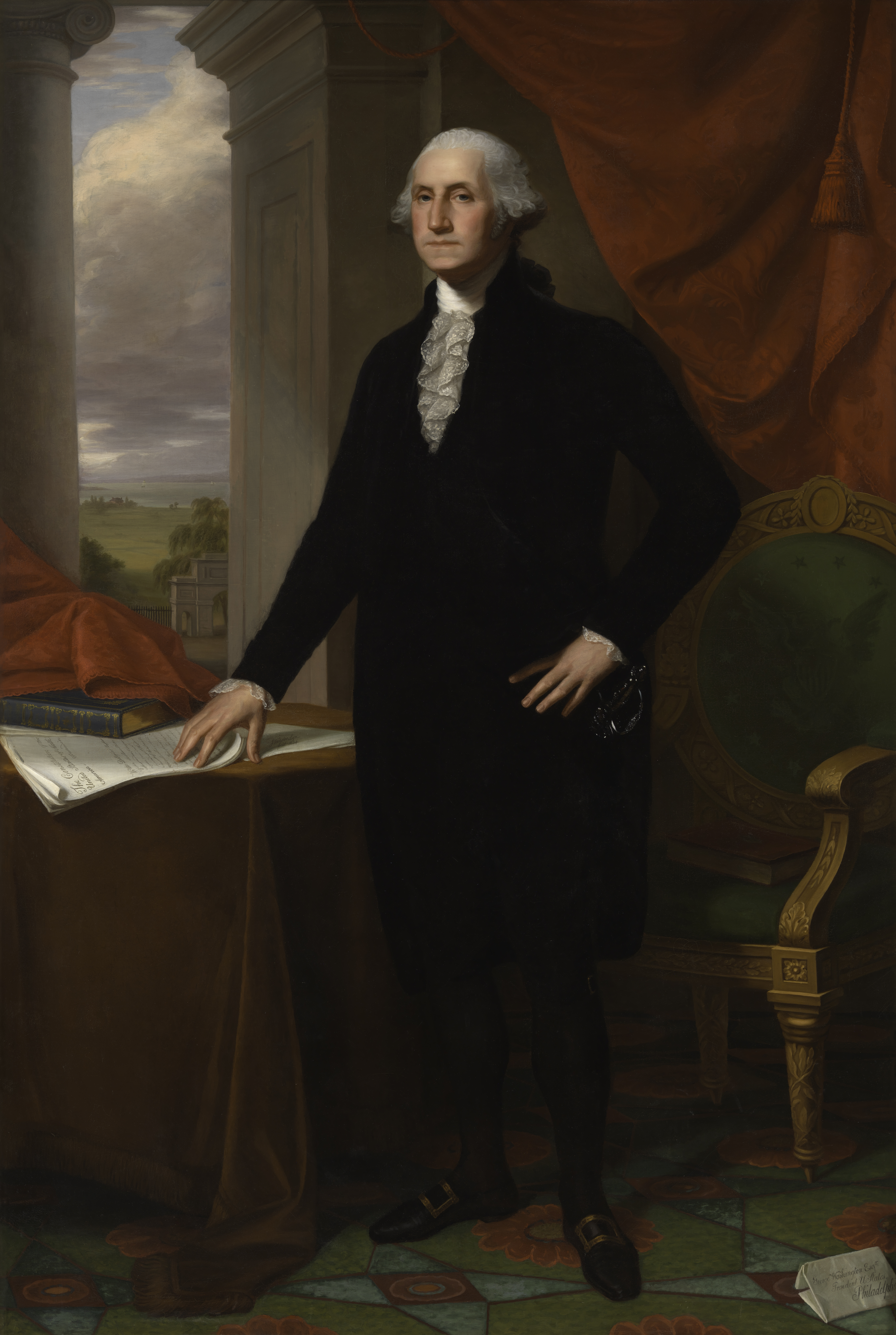
U.S. House of Representatives, John Vanderlyn, 1834

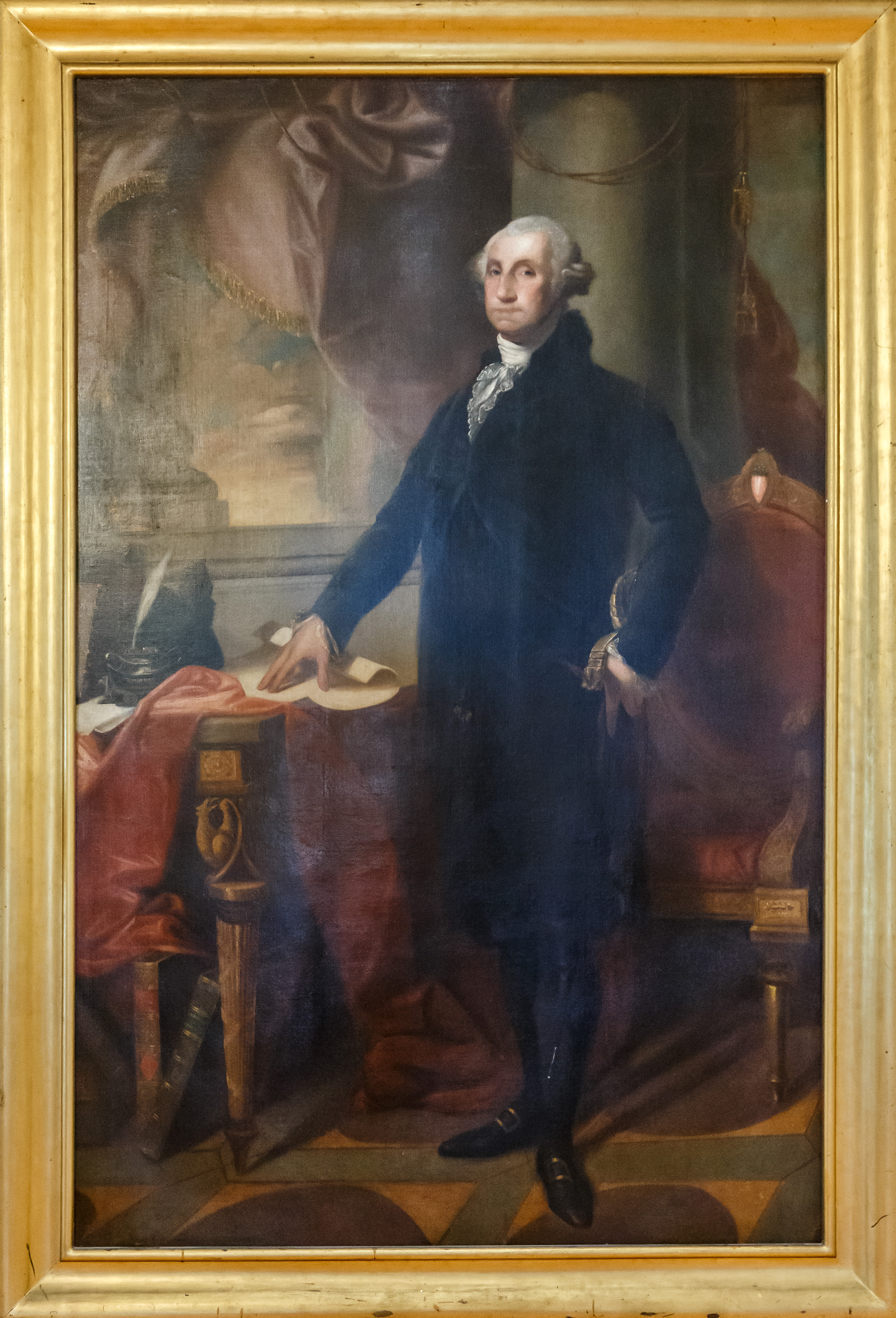
Old Colony History Museum, Taunton, MA, James Sullivan Lincoln, c. 1835

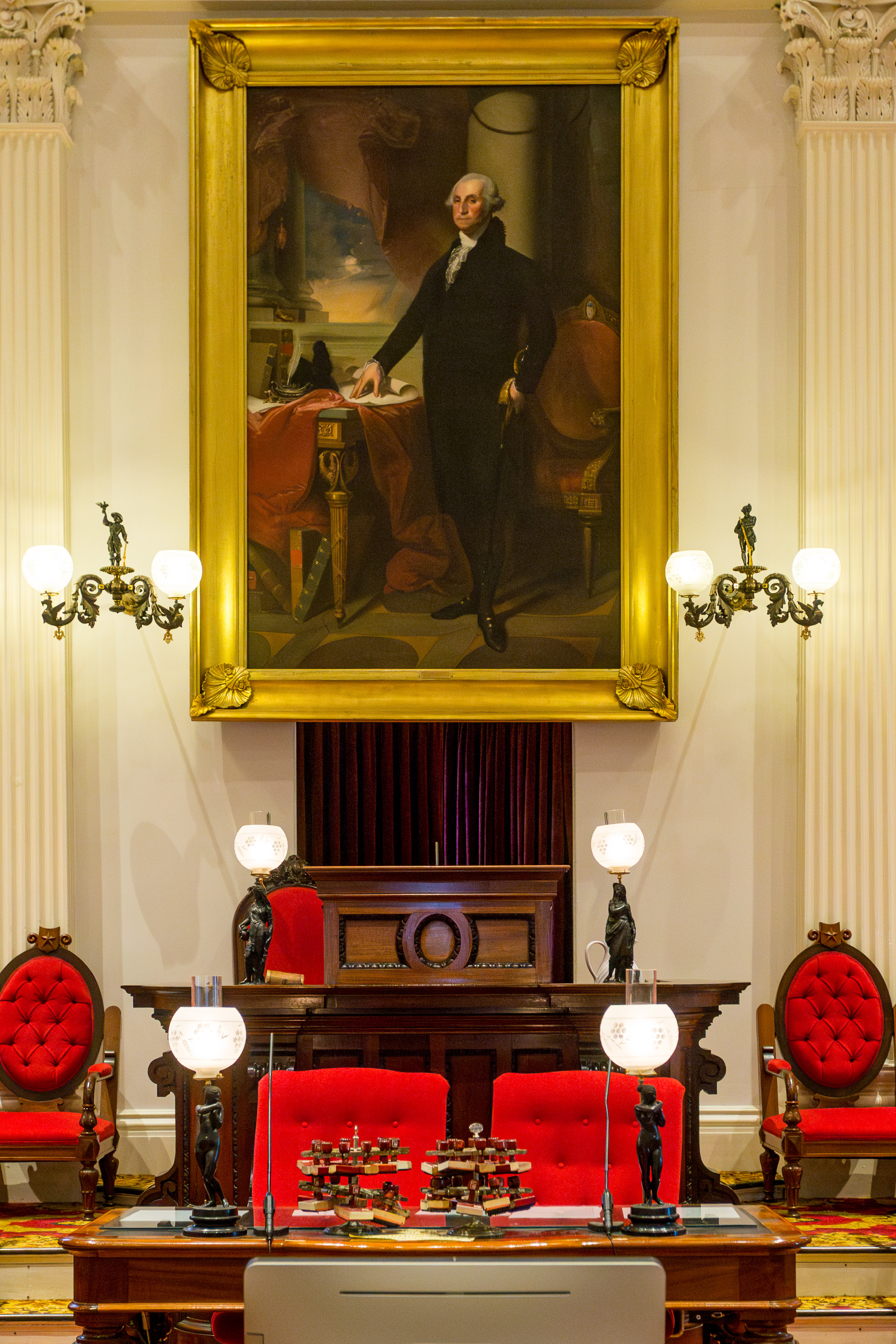
Vermont State House, Montpelier, George Gassner, ca. 1837

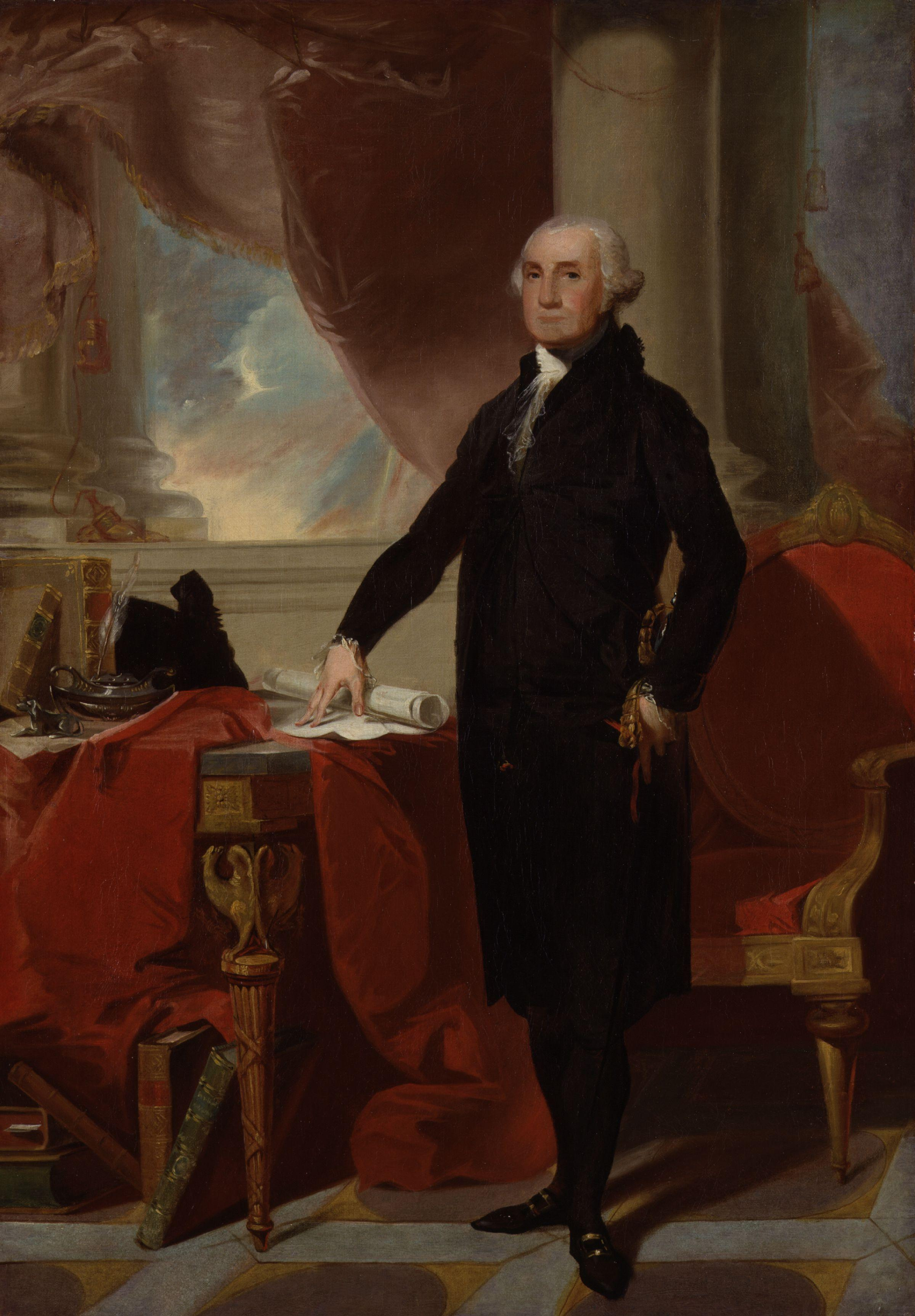
National Portrait Gallery, London, UK. On loan to Montreal Museum of Fine Arts, Quebec, Canada. unknown artist, undated

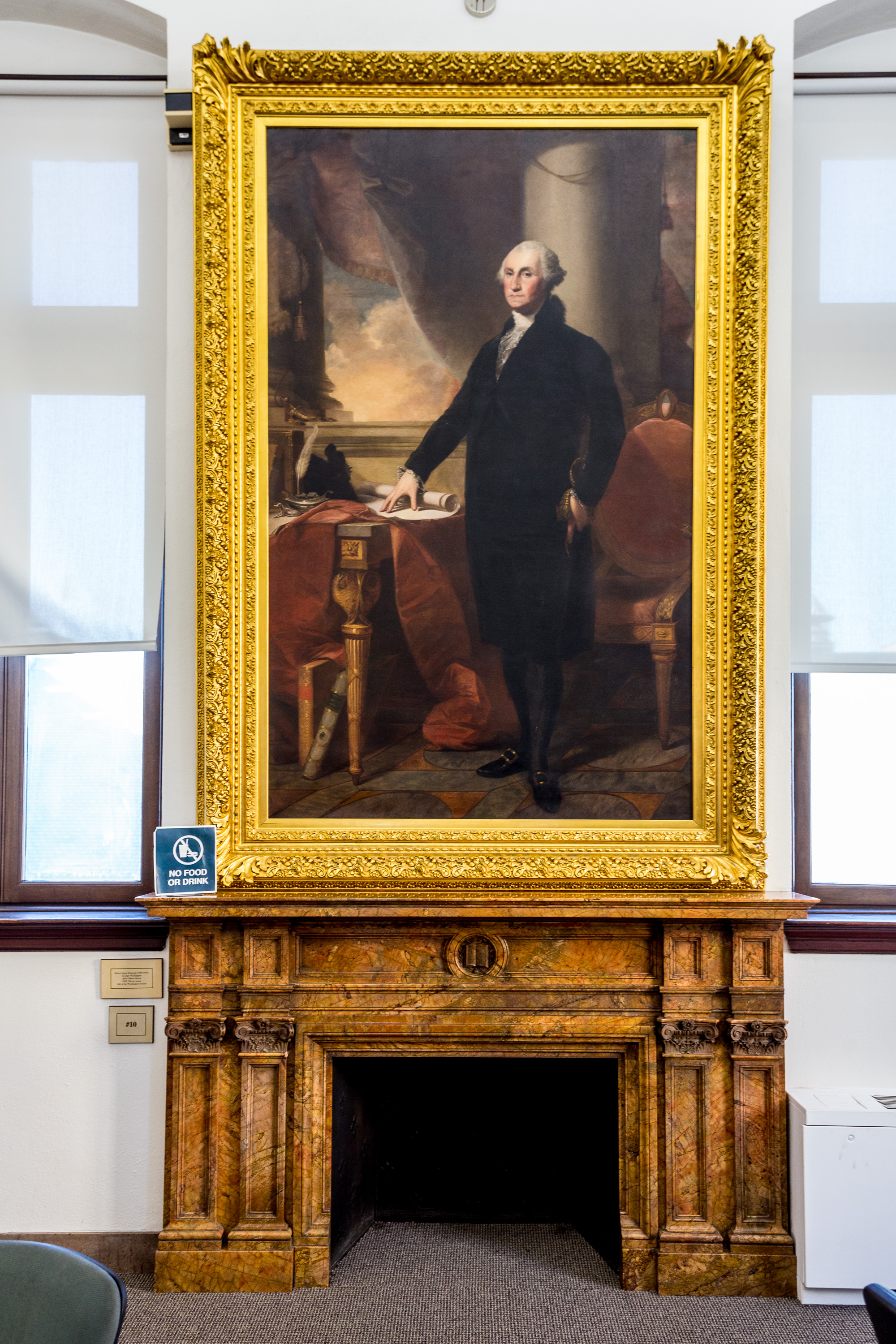
Fall River Public Library, Massachusetts, Robert Spear Dunning, 1892

=== Related works ===
- Portrait of George Washington by Giuseppe Pirovani, 1796, Royal Academy of Fine Arts of San Fernando, Madrid, Spain
- Engraving: General Washington by James Heath, 1800, London
- Engraving: George Washington by Alonzo Chappel, c. 1860, Metropolitan Museum of Art
- Engraving: George Washington by Augustus Weidenbach, 1876
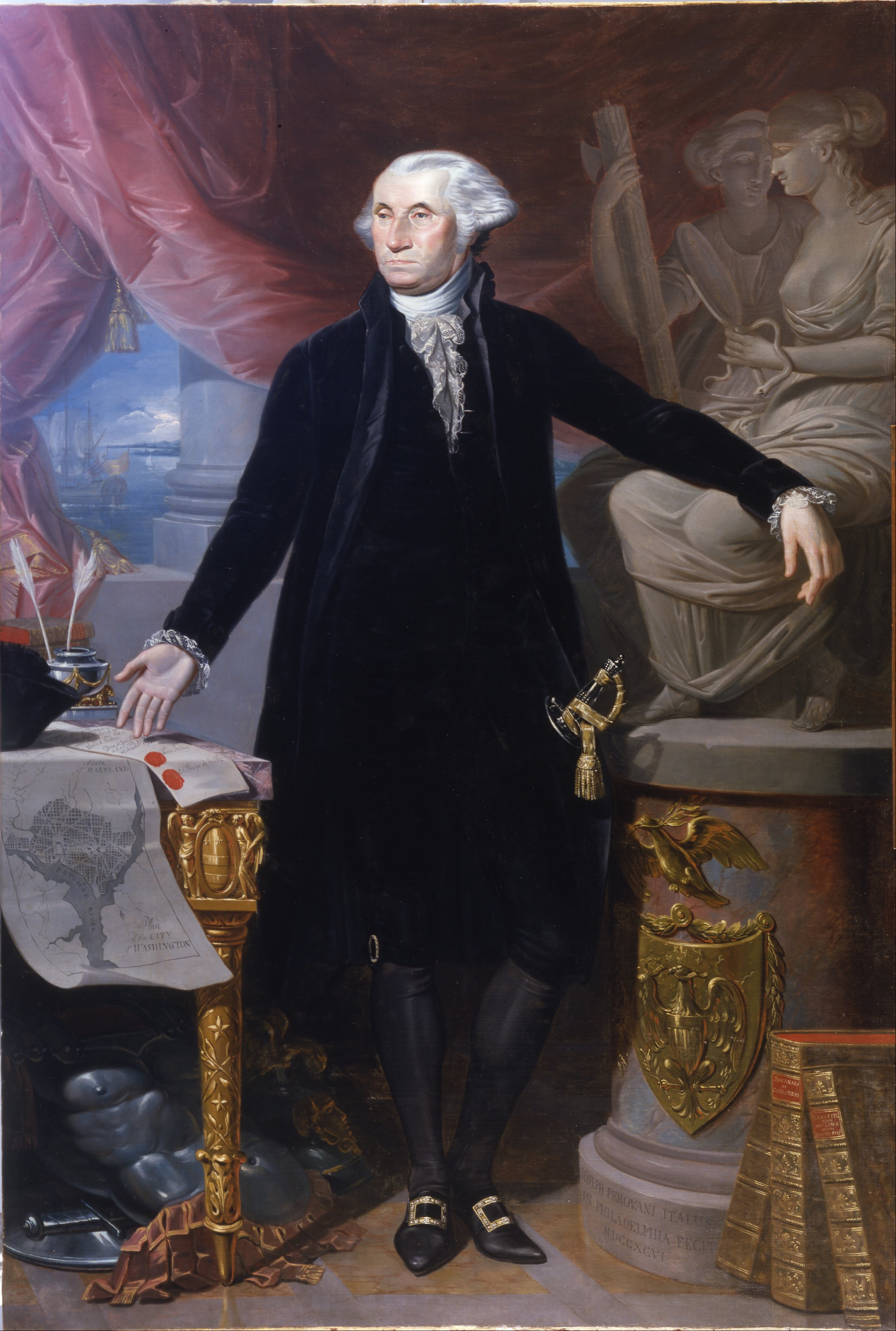
Portrait of George Washington by Giuseppe Perovani, 1796

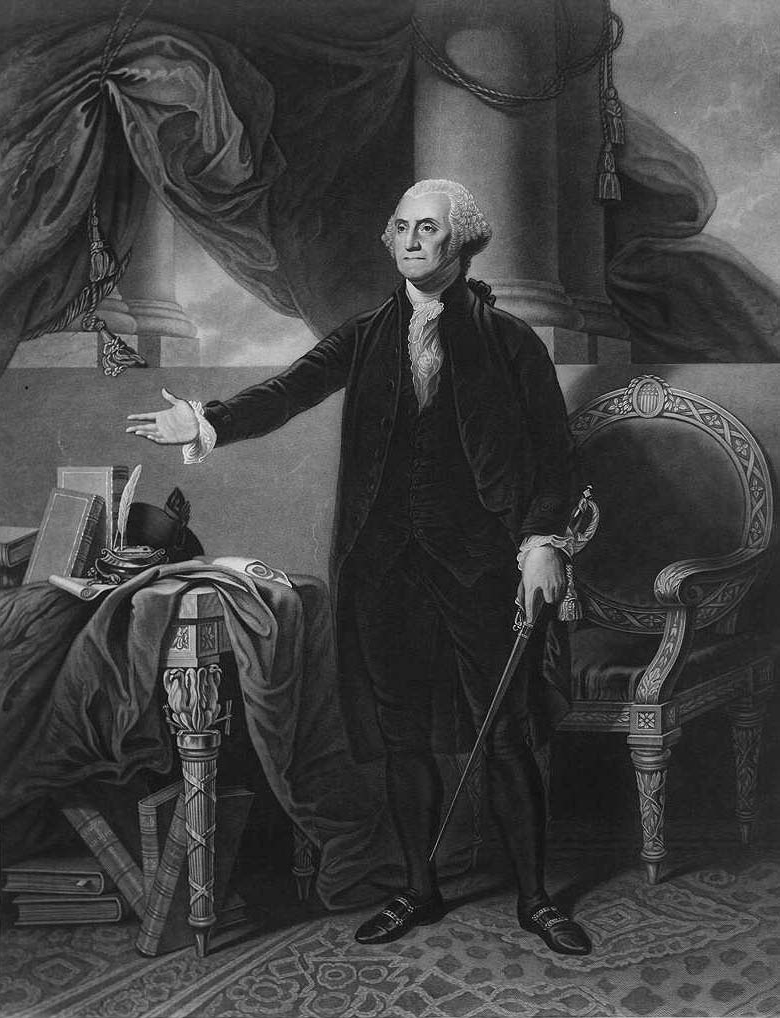
Engraving: General Washington by James Heath, 1800

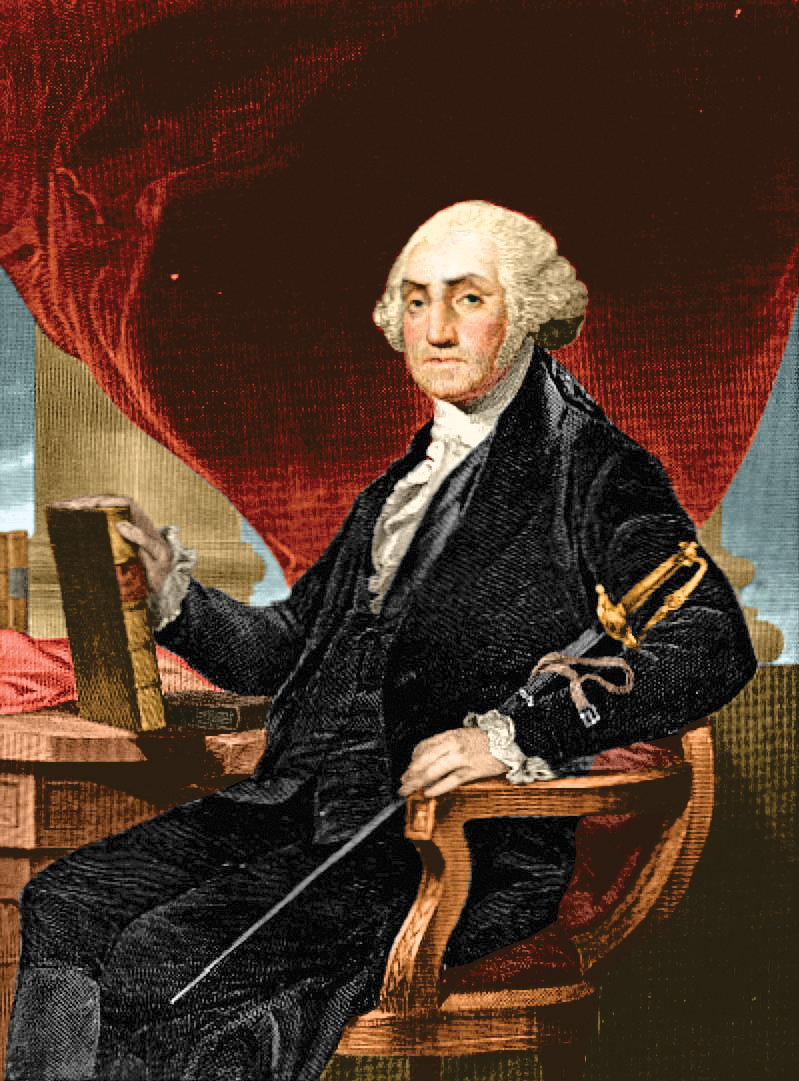
Engraving: George Washington by Alonzo Chappel, c. 1860

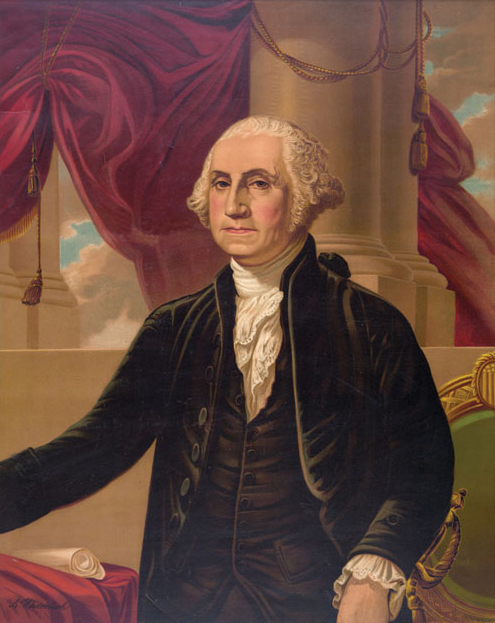
Engraving: George Washington by Karl Augustus Weidenbach, c.1876

== See also ==
- Art in the White House
- List of paintings of George Washington
