= Maria Sèthe at the Harmonium =

Painting by Théo van Rysselberghe

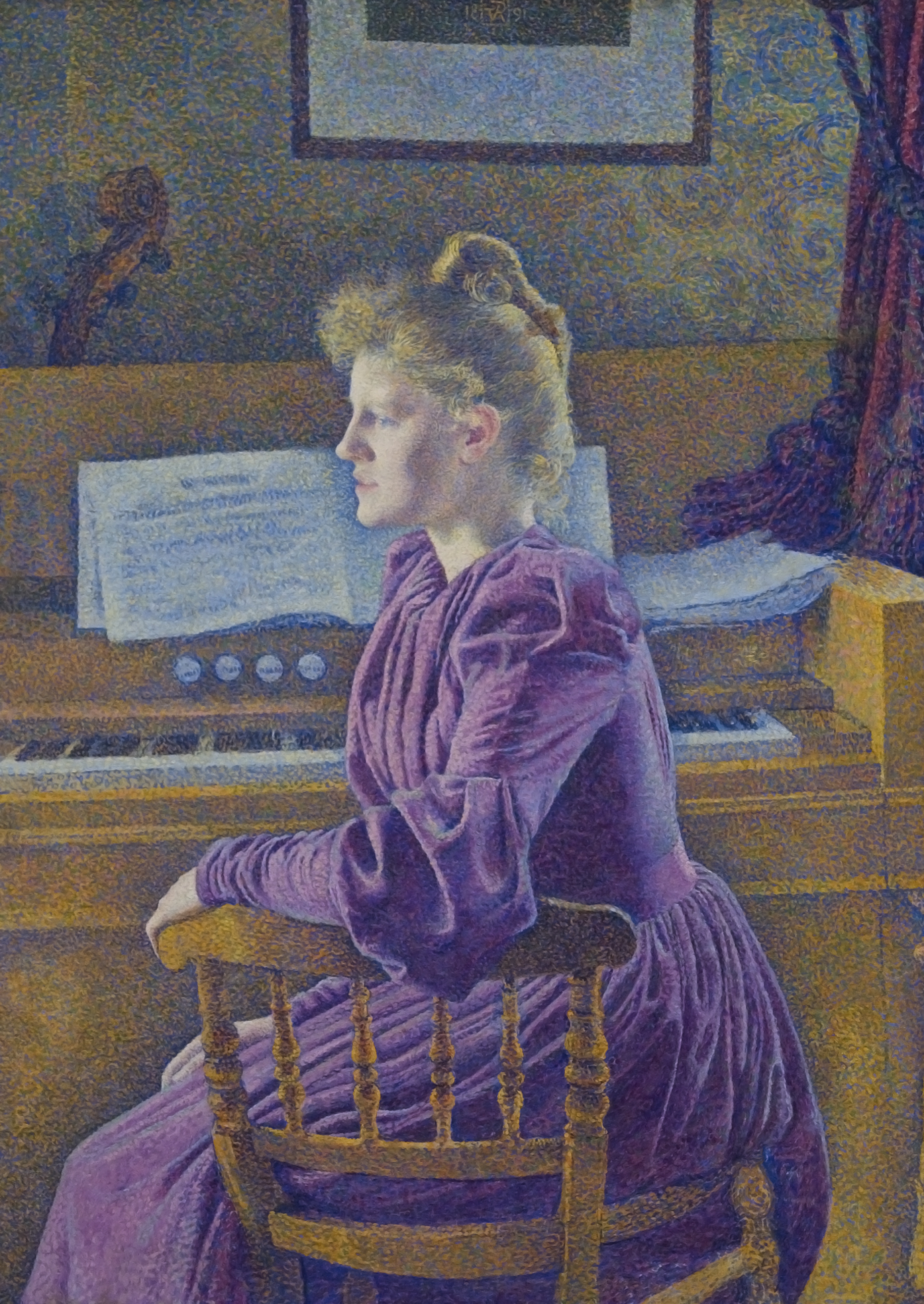
- Artist: Théo van Rysselberghe
- Year: 1891
- Catalogue: 2690
- Medium: Oil on canvas
- Dimensions: 120 cm × 86 cm (47.2 in × 33 8/5 in)
- Location: Royal Museum of Fine Arts Antwerp, Antwerp

Maria Sèthe at the Harmonium is an oil-on-canvas painting by the Belgian neo-impressionist painter Théo van Rysselberghe. It depicts a woman with blonde, worn-up hair and a purple dress, seen in profile gazing toward the left. The sitter was Maria Sèthe, who belonged to an affluent musical family with an interest in the arts. In the painting, she is seated at a harmonium but is not playing it.

The painting shows the influence of Seurat on van Rysselberghe, the latter's adoption of Seurat’s pointillism, and his rejection of Seurat’s style and simplification.

== Painting ==
The subject of the portrait is Maria Sèthe, who later married the modernist architect, painter, designer and exponent of Art Nouveau Henry Van de Velde. She is seated on a chair in front of a harmonium. Behind the harmonium, the head of a cello is visible The harmonium, the cello and the work of art point to the social status of the wealthy Sèthe family and their musical interests.

The painting is signed VTR at the top, along with the date of the portrait.

== Seurat’s influence and van Rysselberghe's style ==
Van Rysselberghe, as a Belgian, was imbued with the portrait tradition of Dutch and Flemish masters, and as a 19th-century artist, he was attuned to the artistic tastes of the bourgeoisie.

In 1886, Van Rysselberghe visited the Impressionist exhibition in Paris. There, he discovered the work of the French artist Georges Seurat, and thereupon embraced Neo-Impressionism.

The Pointillists used a technique in which small, distinct dots of primary color are applied in patterns to form an image.

The practice of Pointillism is in sharp contrast to the traditional methods of blending pigments on a palette. Because of the way the human brain works, the viewer then perceives a secondary color. Placing red and yellow stipples next to each other, for instance, makes us see orange. The painting technique used for Pointillist color mixing is at the expense of the traditional brushwork used to delineate texture.

Strict color theory and systematic method were applied less stringently after Seurat’s death. The brushwork became more personal and expressive. Color became increasingly important. There was more room for personal insight and a less analytical approach. In this way, Pointillism eventually led to the birth of 20th-century modernism.

Van Rysselberghe painted little dots for expressive parts, such as hands and face. The rest of the work was done with larger touches. He did not adopt Seurat’s style and simplification, but instead painted realistically with close attention to volume, light and shadow. His pointillist paintings create a bright, almost luminous impression. In this instance, the purple of Maria Sèthe's dress is overwhelming. Equally attractive is the blonde hair realized in yellow and orange, complementary colours of purple and blue.
