= Portrait of a Man (Van Heemskerck) =

Painting attributed to Maarten van Heemskerck

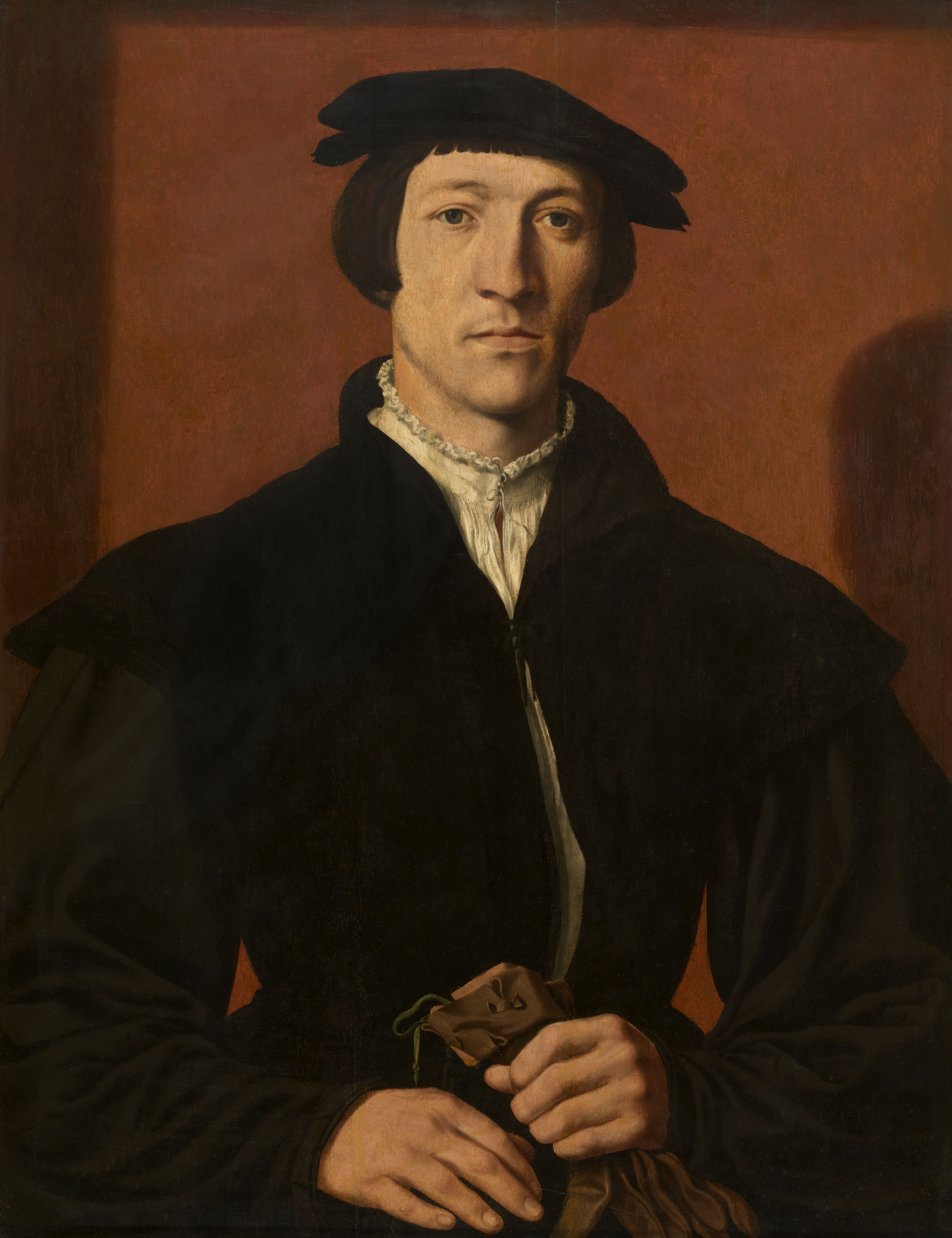
- Artist: Maarten van Heemskerck
- Year: 16th century
- Type: oil painting
- Dimensions: 69 cm × 52 cm (29.5 in × 20 4/7 in)
- Location: Royal Museum of Fine Arts; Antwerp

Portrait of a Man is an oil painting attributed to the Dutch painter Maarten van Heemskerck. The painting is kept in the Royal Museum of Fine Arts, in Antwerp.

== Painting ==
The man is depicted half-length, with his arms resting on a table edge, looking at the viewer head-on.

He is dressed in a sober black cloth suit. The man wears a close-fitting jerkin and a high, closed collar. Underneath, a white shirt with a frown collar is visible. The man also wears a beret.

His expression seems serious, but not quite so. The fact that the man is holding, not wearing, his gloves, which are worn when meeting important people and taken off as a gesture of courtesy and respect, enhance the man's friendliness. By holding his gloves, the man shows both respect and that he wants to be respected.
