= Biddende Maria =

Painting by Quentin Matsys

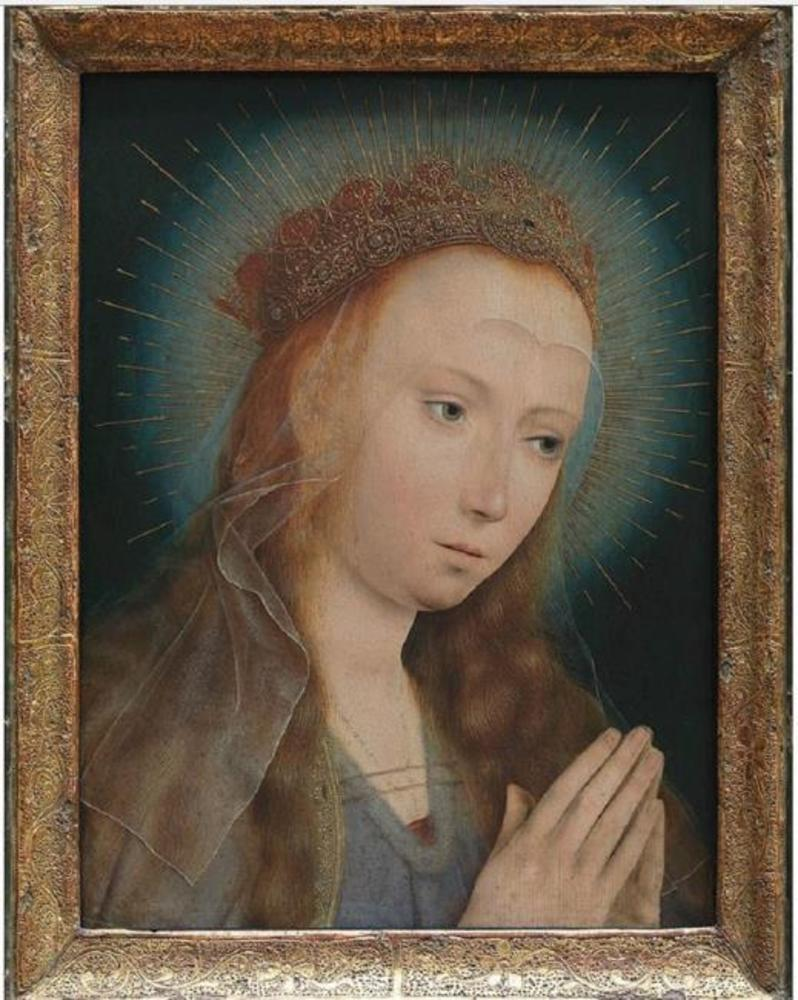
- Artist: Quentin Massys
- Year: ca. 1500
- Medium: Oil on panel
- Dimensions: 40.9 cm × 30.6 cm (16.1 in × 12 in)
- Location: Royal Museum of Fine Arts Antwerp; Antwerp

The Biddende Maria (Mary in Prayer or Virgin at prayer) is an oil-on-panel painting by the Flemish Renaissance artist Quentin Matsys. The painting was produced in the first decade of the 16th century, probably in 1500. The painting is currently housed at the Royal Museum of Fine Arts in Antwerp. The panel is the interior of the left wing of a diptych with the painting on the other side being a Salvator Mundi.

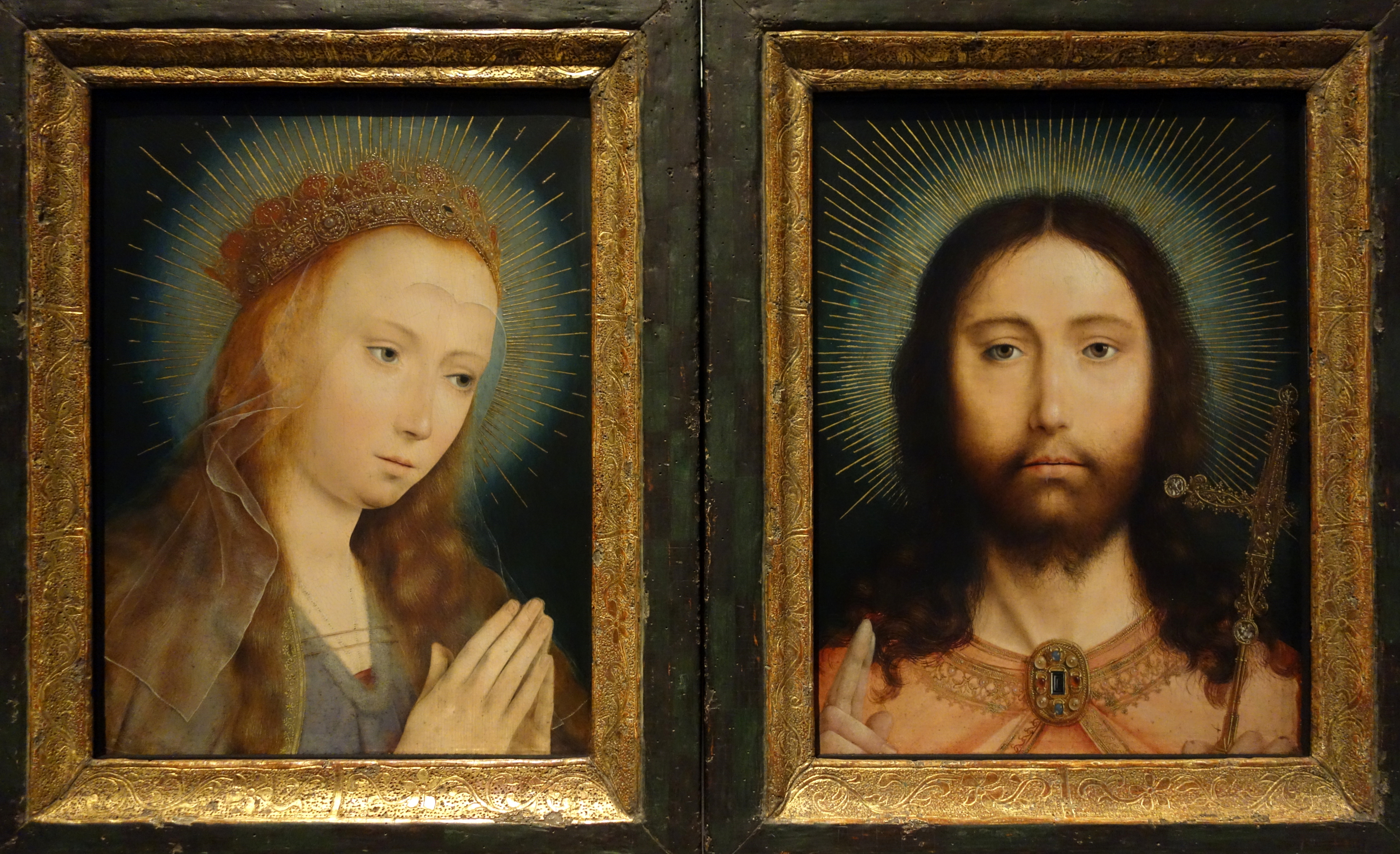
Diptych with Virgin at Prayer and Salvador Mundi

== Painting ==
The painting depicts Mary at prayer. Her head is covered with a gauze veil upon which rests a crown. The painting's delicate rendering and soft hues create a sweetness that is tempered by the figure's stately and austere bearing.
