= Christ Surrounded by Singing and Music-making Angels =

Triptych by Hans Memling

- Artist: Hans Memling
- Year: c. 1483-1494
- Medium: Oil on panel
- Dimensions: 165 cm × 672 cm (64.9 in × 264.5 in)
- Location: Royal Museum of Fine Arts Antwerp

Christ Surrounded by Singing and Music-making Angels or Santa María la Real de Nájera Altarpiece, is a triptych by the Flemish painter of German origin Hans Memling, active in Bruges in the second half of fifteenth-century. The altarpiece was commissioned by wealthy Spanish traders as the high altarpiece for the monastic church of Santa Maria la Real in Nájera. Only three panels of the original altarpiece survive. In the nineteenth century, they were acquired by the Royal Museum of Fine Arts of Antwerp, where they are now exhibited. These panels have been described as an avant-garde work in Renaissance decorative art.

== Historical context ==
The altarpiece was commissioned in 1487 by the consuls of the Spanish merchants in Bruges, Pedro, and Antonio de Nájera, to decorate the organ of the Santa María la Real of Nájera, the former pantheon of the kings of Navarre. Some of the ornaments of the 17 (larger-than-life) figures depicted bear the arms of Castile and León. The original altarpiece was huge, and the three surviving paintings were likely part of its upper tier. The central panel depicted the Assumption of the Virgin Mary.

This is a rare work in which Christ is depicted surrounded by angelic musicians. After having been abandoned for four centuries, it was bought in 1885 by an art dealer and sold to the Belgian government, which entrusted it to the Royal Museum of Fine Arts of Antwerp. An extensive restoration campaign began in 2001. It took a total of 16 years, due partly to the huge surface area of the work and the complex nature of the treatment.

== Composition ==
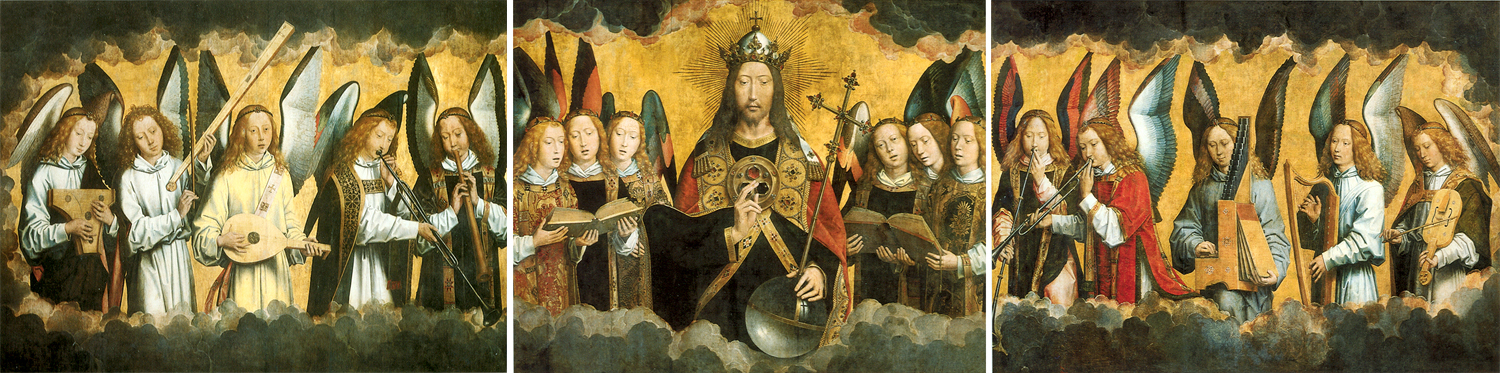
The three panels

The Christ surrounded by angels stands against a golden background surrounded by black clouds. On his collar are the words Agyos Otheos (Holy God). The three precious stones which adorn the fibula of his mantle evoke the Holy Trinity: God the Father, God the Son and the Holy Spirit. With his crown and his crystal ball surmounted by a cross, he reigns over the Christian kingdom, both celestial and terrestrial. He is flanked by sixteen angels who sing (6) and play music (10). Their instruments are typical of the fifteenth century.

The scene was possibly inspired by the passage from the Gospel according to Matthew, which mentions: "When the Son of man comes in his glory, accompanied by all the angels, then he will sit on his throne of glory" (Matthew 25: 31–46).

The central panel represents Christ blessing and looking down in the direction of the Virgin Mary, his mother, with three angels on either side. Each group of angels holds a large songbook. On the two side shutters, angels play musical instruments, five on each side. In the left panel the instruments are, from left to right, a psaltery, a tromba marina, a lute, a trumpet and a shawm. In the right panel, from left to right, there are a straight trumpet, a looped trumpet, a portative organ, a harp and a fiddle. The panels are 170 cm (5 ft 7 in) high, thus the angels, or what we can see of them (the clouds obscure the part of their body below the knee), are life-size.

Many replicas of these panels have been produced.
