= Seated Nude (1917) =

1917 painting by Amedeo Modigliani

- Nudo seduto
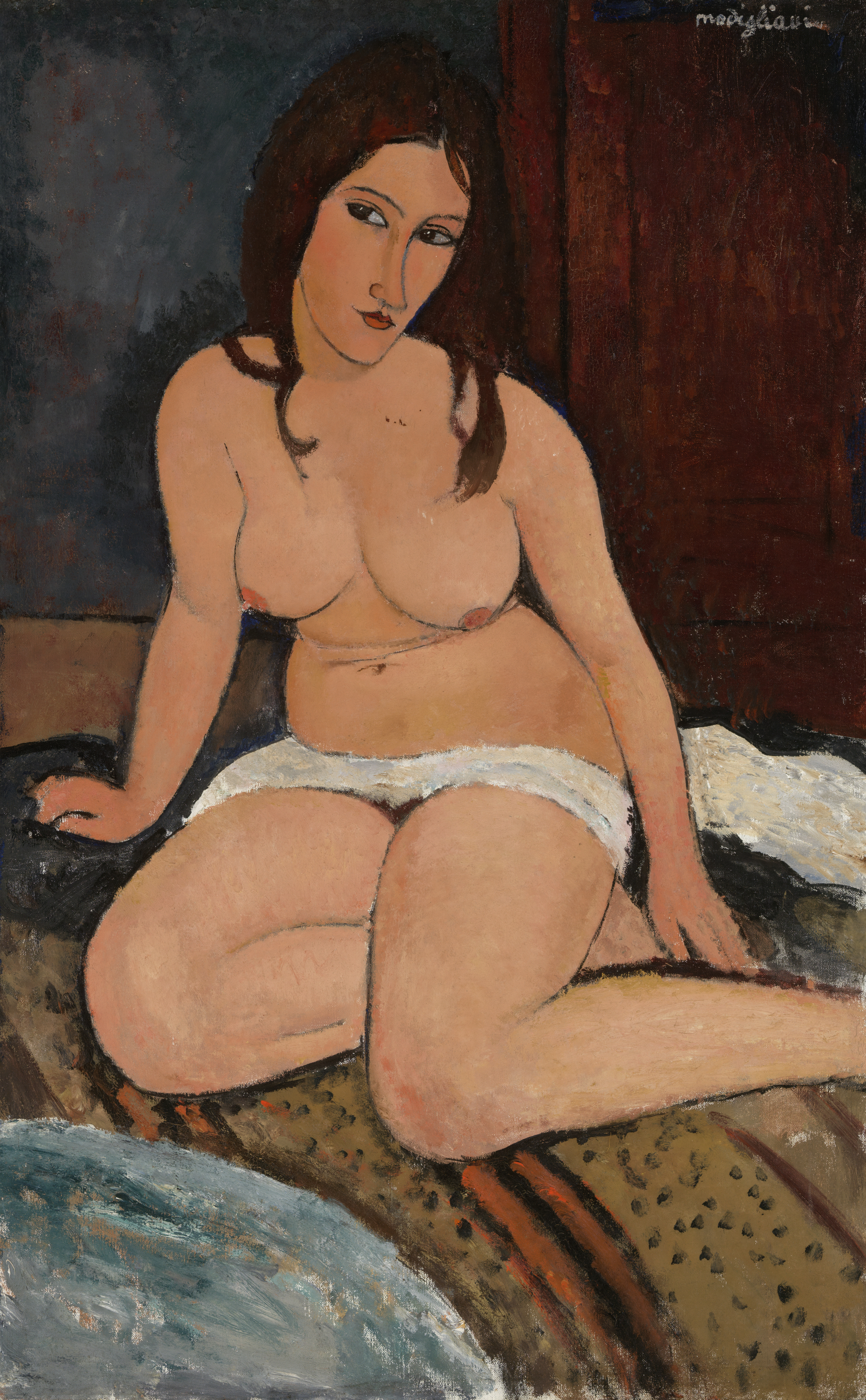
- Artist: Amedeo Modigliani
- Year: c. 1917
- Medium: oil paint, canvas
- Dimensions: 114 cm (45 in) × 74 cm (29 in)
- Location: Royal Museum of Fine Arts Antwerp
- Accession no.: 2060
- Identifiers: Bildindex der Kunst und Architektur ID: 20424269

Seated Nude is a 1917 painting by Amedeo Modigliani, now in the Royal Museum of Fine Arts, Antwerp.
