= Royal Museum of Fine Arts Antwerp =

Art museum in Antwerp, Belgium

- Koninklijk Museum voor Schone Kunsten Antwerpen
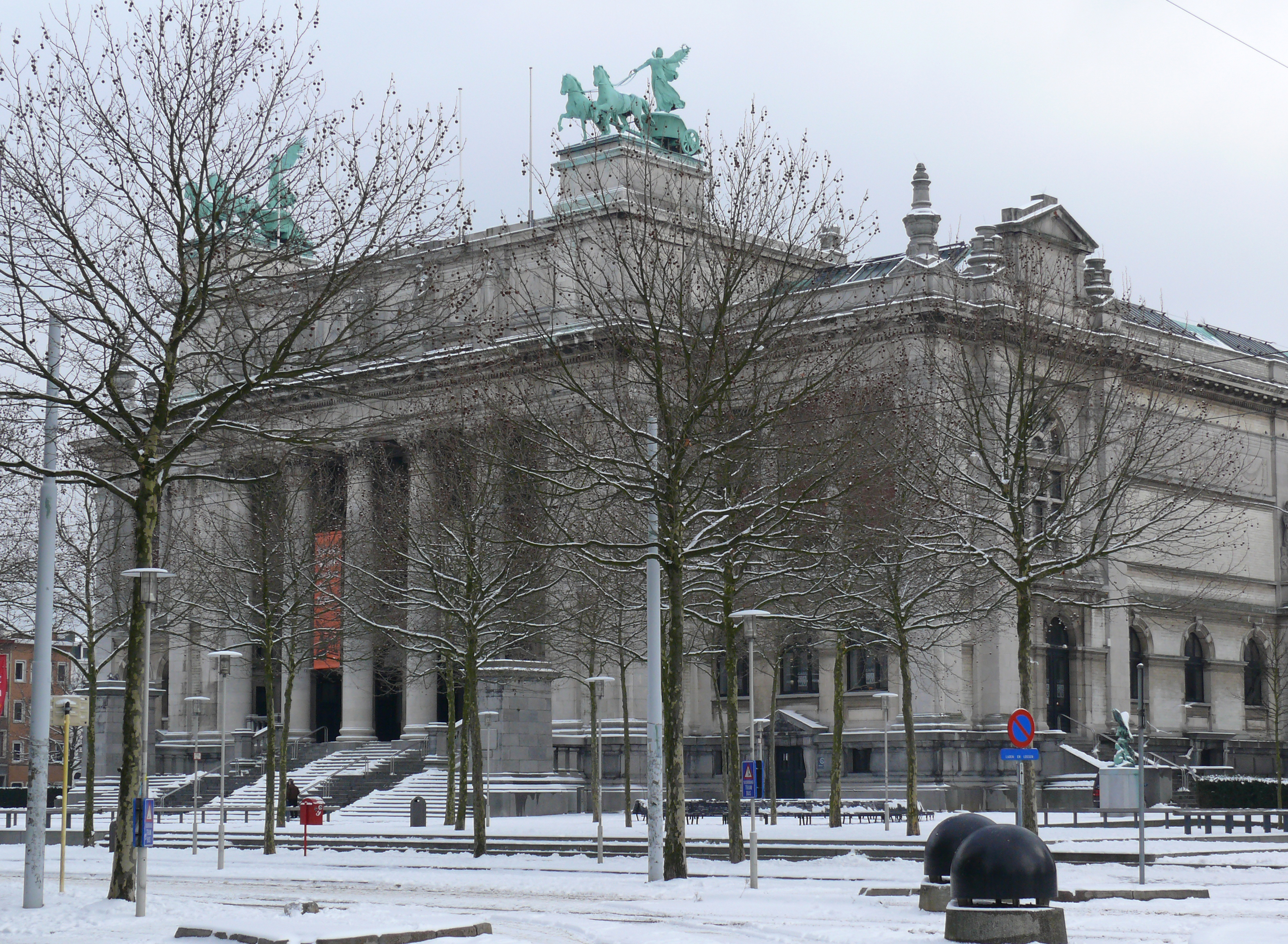
- Koninklijk Museum voor Schone Kunsten
- Interactive fullscreen map
- Established: 1810
- Location: Antwerp, Belgium
- Coordinates: 51°12′32″N 4°23′40″E
- Type: Art museum
- Key holdings: Flemish painting
- Website: www.kmska.be

The Royal Museum of Fine Arts Antwerp (Dutch: Koninklijk Museum voor Schone Kunsten Antwerpen; KMSKA) is a museum in Antwerp, Belgium, founded in 1810, that houses a collection of paintings, sculptures and drawings from the fourteenth to the twentieth centuries. This collection is representative of the artistic production and the taste of art enthusiasts in Antwerp, Belgium and the Northern and Southern Netherlands since the 15th century.

The neoclassical building housing the collection is one of the primary landmarks of the Zuid district of Antwerp. The majestic building was designed by Jean-Jacques Winders (1849–1936) and Frans Van Dijk (1853–1939), built beginning in 1884, opened in 1890, and completed in 1894. Sculpture on the building includes two bronze figures of Pheme with horse-drawn chariots by sculptor Thomas Vincotte, and seven rondel medallions of artists that include Boetius à Bolswert, Frans Floris, Jan van Eyck, Peter Paul Rubens, Quentin Matsys, Erasmus Quellinus II, and Appelmans, separated by four monumental sculptures representing Architecture, Painting, Sculpture, and Graphics.

The building stands in gardens bounded by the Leopold de Waalplaats, the Schildersstraat, the Plaatsnijdersstraat, and the Beeldhouwersstraat, formerly the site of the Antwerp Citadel.

== History ==
The museum's collection began with the artworks owned by the Antwerp Guild of Saint Luke, which was active from the late 14th century to 1773. When the guild disbanded, its gallery of paintings went to the Academy of Fine Arts, which had been founded in 1663 with the involvement of David Teniers. The gallery had works by Peter Paul Rubens, Jacob Jordaens, and Cornelis de Vos. During French occupations in 1794 and 1796, art was looted from churches and other buildings in Antwerp; the pieces that were later recovered became part of the museum's collection. By 1817 the museum listed 127 items in its catalogue, mostly dating to the mid-16th and 17th centuries, with Rubens at the heart of the collection.

William I of the Netherlands helped the museum in various ways. In 1823 he donated three paintings, including an early work by Titian—Pope Alexander IV presents Jacopo Pesaro to Saint Peter—which became the museum's first foreign piece. He decreed a grant of 20,000 guilders to build the collection's contemporary art in 1827, but the Belgian Revolution interfered. Only in 1873 did the museum begin to acquire living artists' works.

A significant bequest from a former mayor of Antwerp, Florent van Ertborn, added 141 works to the collection in 1840. Van Ertborn had collected Early Netherlandish art at a time when it was out of favour, but in the long run this addition ensured the museum's reputation. These works included Jan van Eyck's Saint Barbara and Madonna at the Fountain and Rogier van der Weyden's Portrait of Philip de Croy (half of a diptych) and the Seven Sacraments Altarpiece. Also in the bequest were paintings by Hans Memling, Dieric Bouts, Joachim Patinir, Quinten Massys, Jean Fouquet, Simone Martini, Antonello da Messina, and Lucas Cranach.

The museum closed to the public for major renovations at the end of 2011, reopening on 24 September 2022 after 11 years of work. The museum has been expanded with a new hall for modern art.

== Collections ==
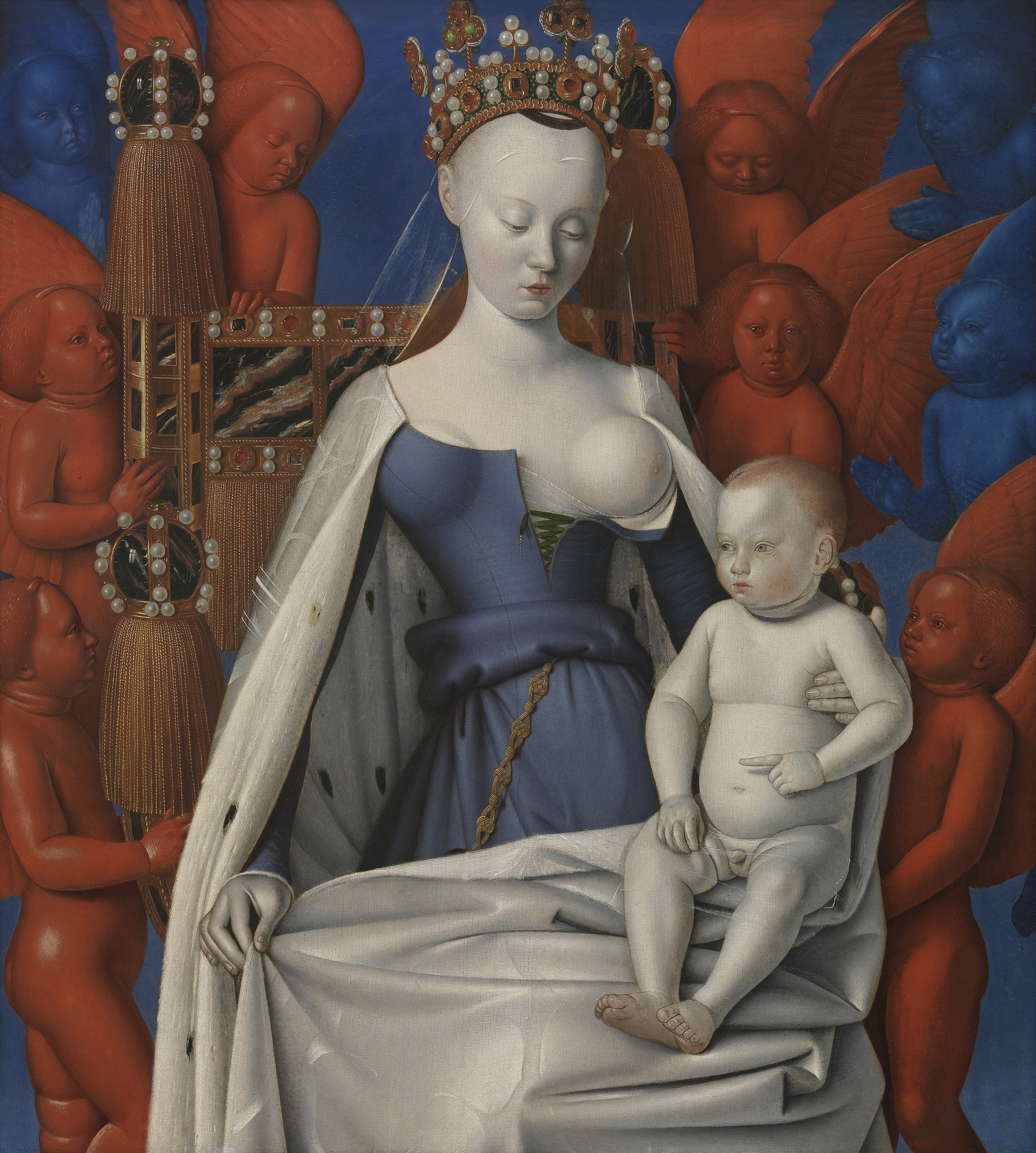
Jean Fouquet, Virgin and Child Surrounded by Angels

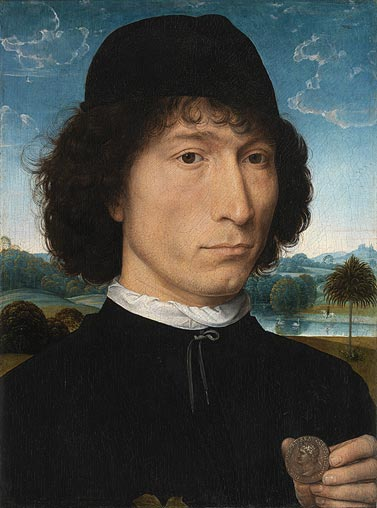
Hans Memling, Portrait of a Man with a Roman medal

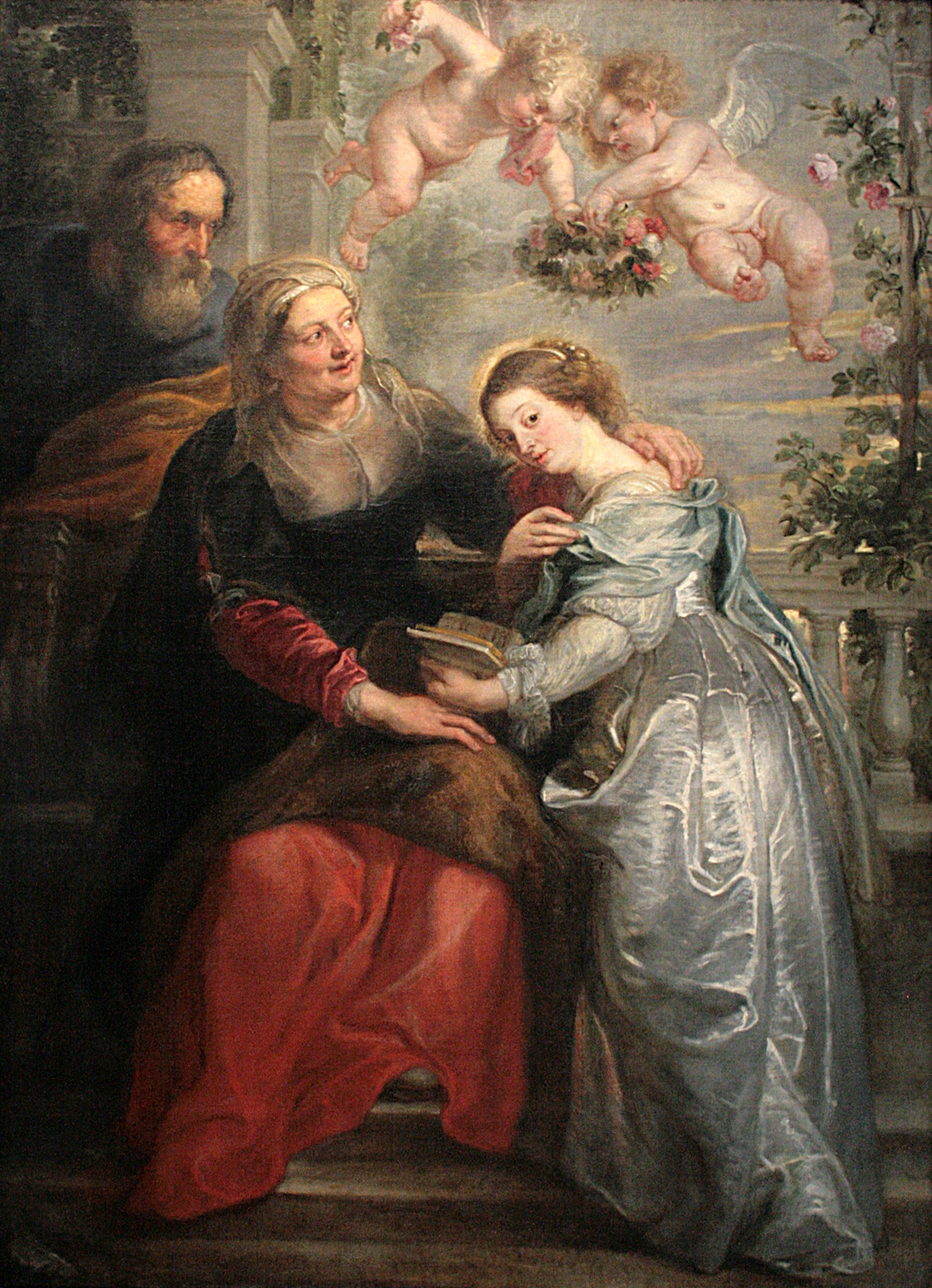
The Education of Mary by Peter Paul Rubens.

Artists exhibited in the museum include:

- 15th century
  - Jan van Eyck
  - Jean Fouquet
  - Rogier van der Weyden
  - Hans Memling
- 16th century:
  - Frans Floris de Vriendt
  - Quinten Metsijs
  - Joachim Patinir
  - Marten de Vos
  - Gillis Coignet
- 17th century:
  - Erasmus de Bie
  - Jan Brueghel the Elder
  - Anthony van Dyck
  - Frans Hals
  - Jacob Jordaens
  - Theodoor Rombouts
  - Peter Paul Rubens
- 19th century:
  - James Ensor
  - Auguste Rodin
  - Henry van de Velde
  - Fernand Khnopff
  - Alexandre Cabanel, Cleopatra Testing Poisons on Condemned Prisoners
- 20th century:
  - Pierre Alechinsky
  - René Magritte
  - Jacob Smits
  - Gustave Van de Woestijne
  - Rik Wouters

== Collection highlights ==
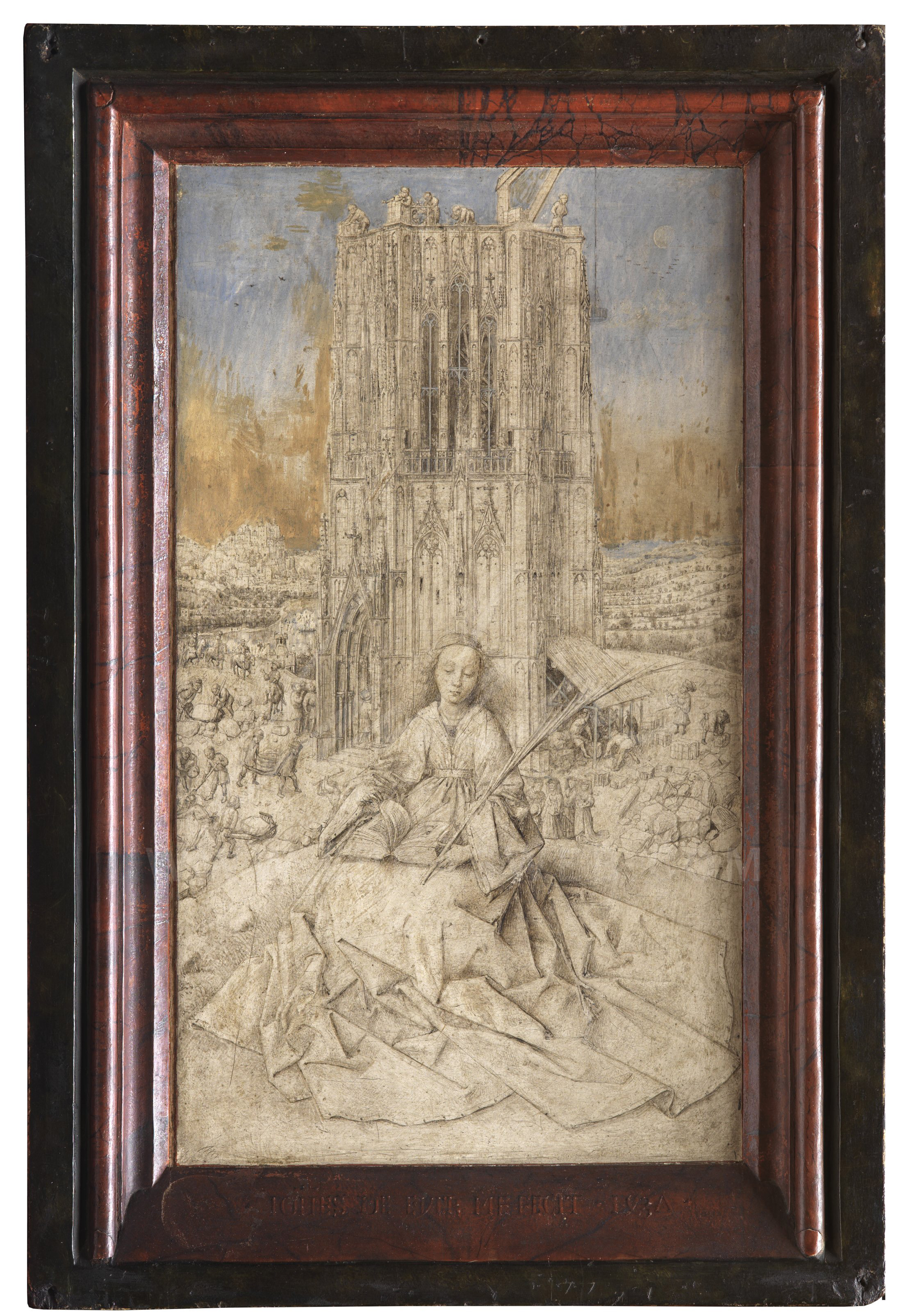
Saint Barbara of Nicomedia by Jan van Eyck. 1437

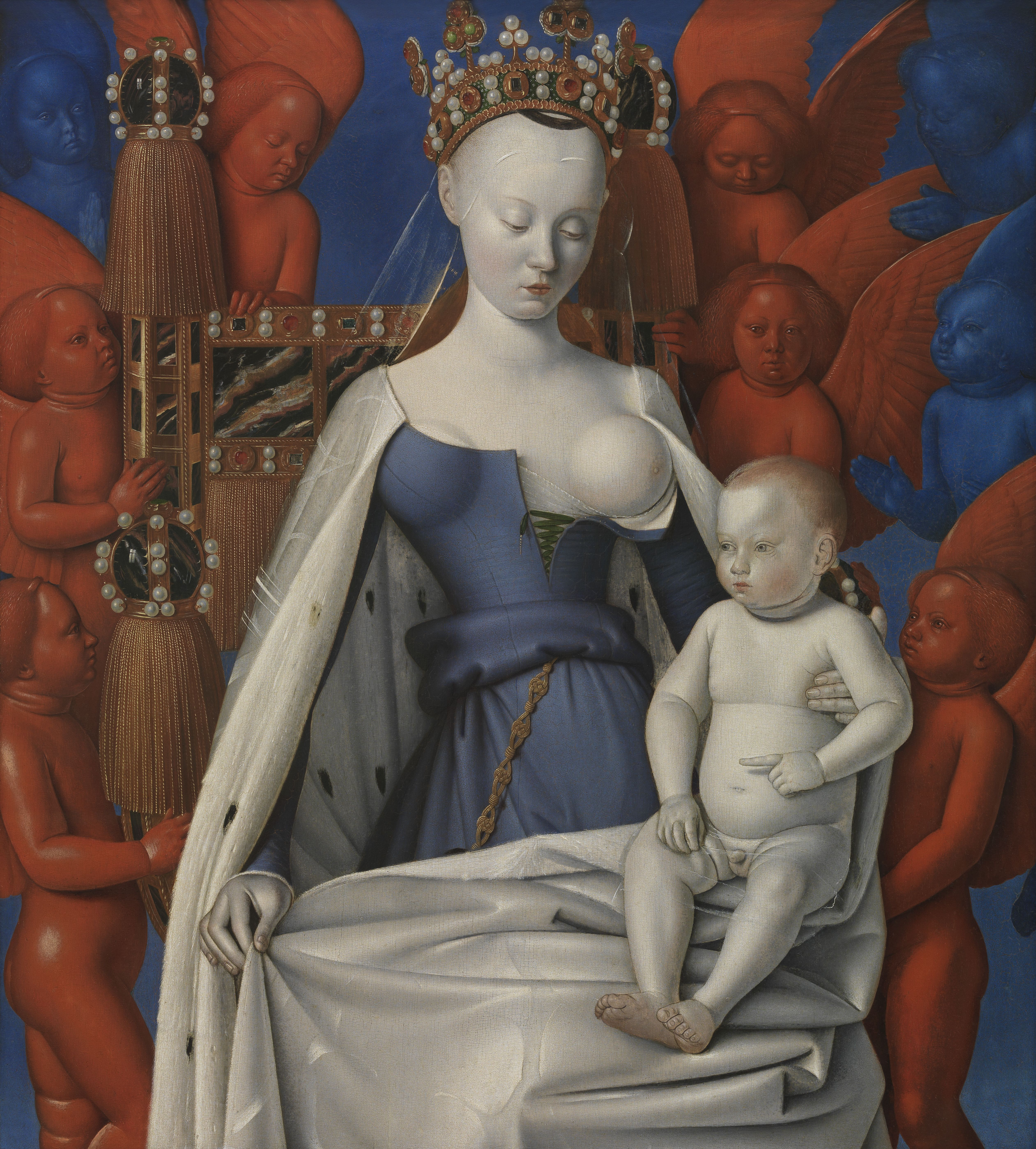
Virgin and Child Surrounded by Angels by Jean Fouquet. c. 1454

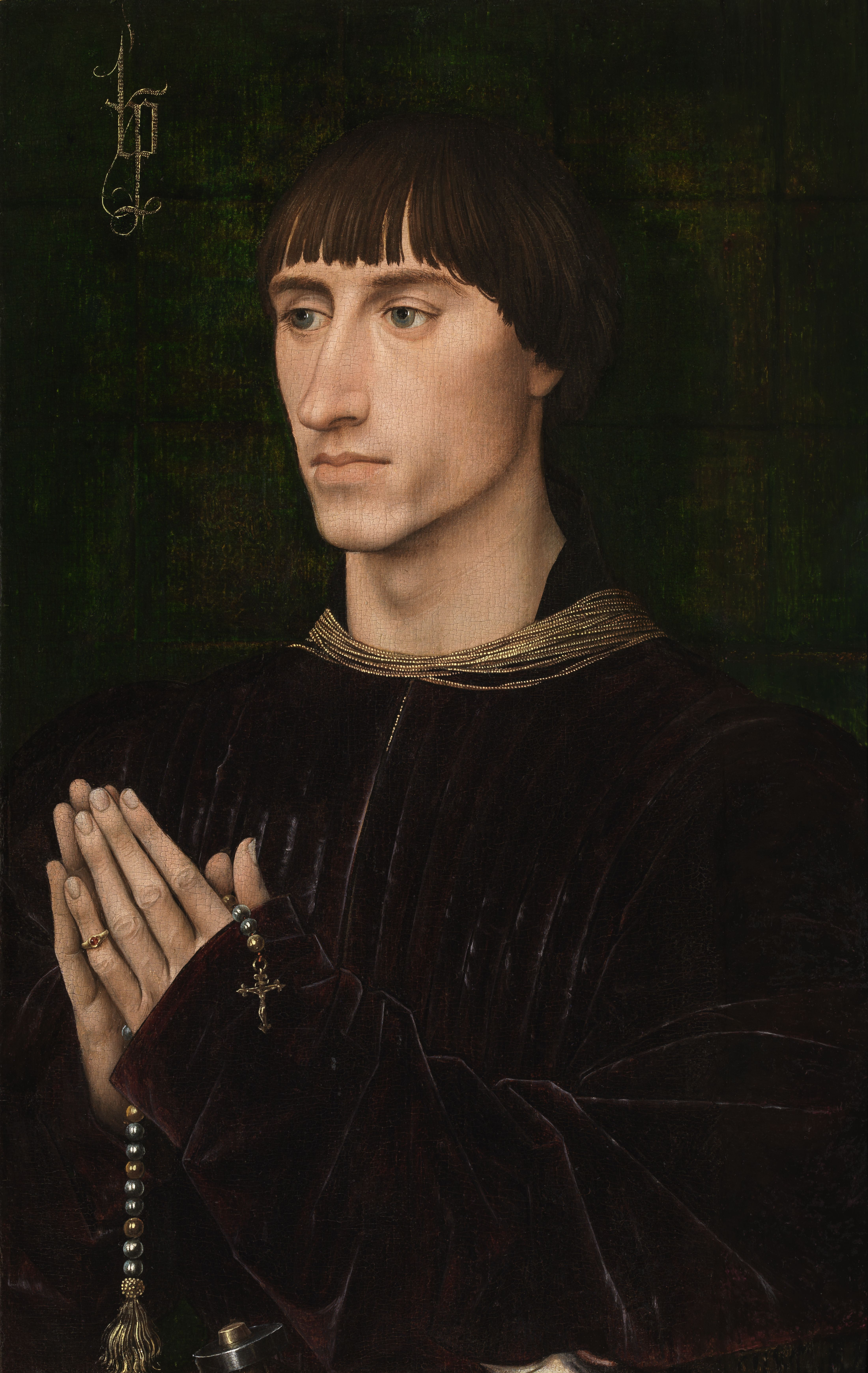
Portrait of Philippe I de Croÿ by Rogier van der Weyden. 1460

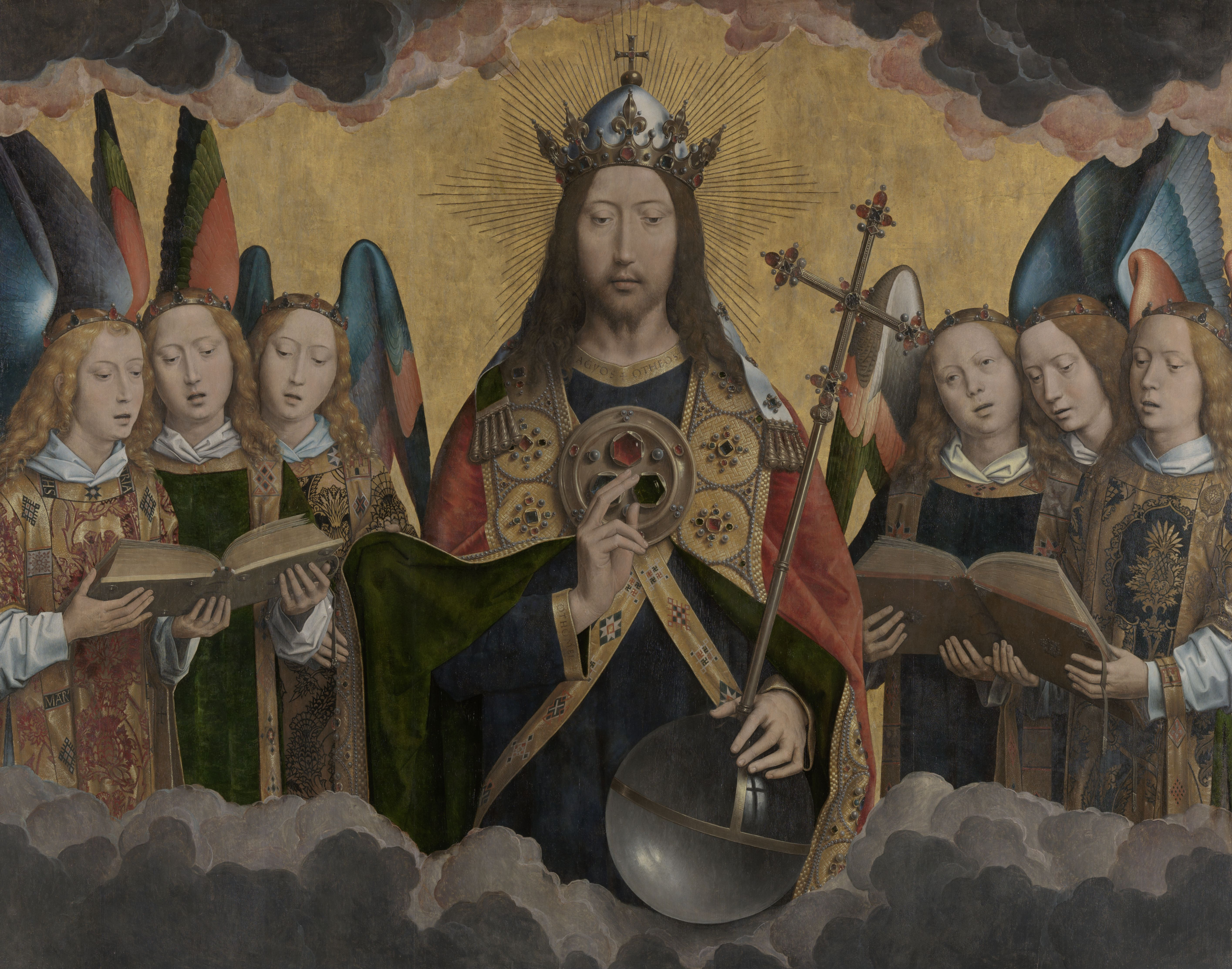
God the Father with Singing and Music-making Angels by Hans Memling. c. 1483

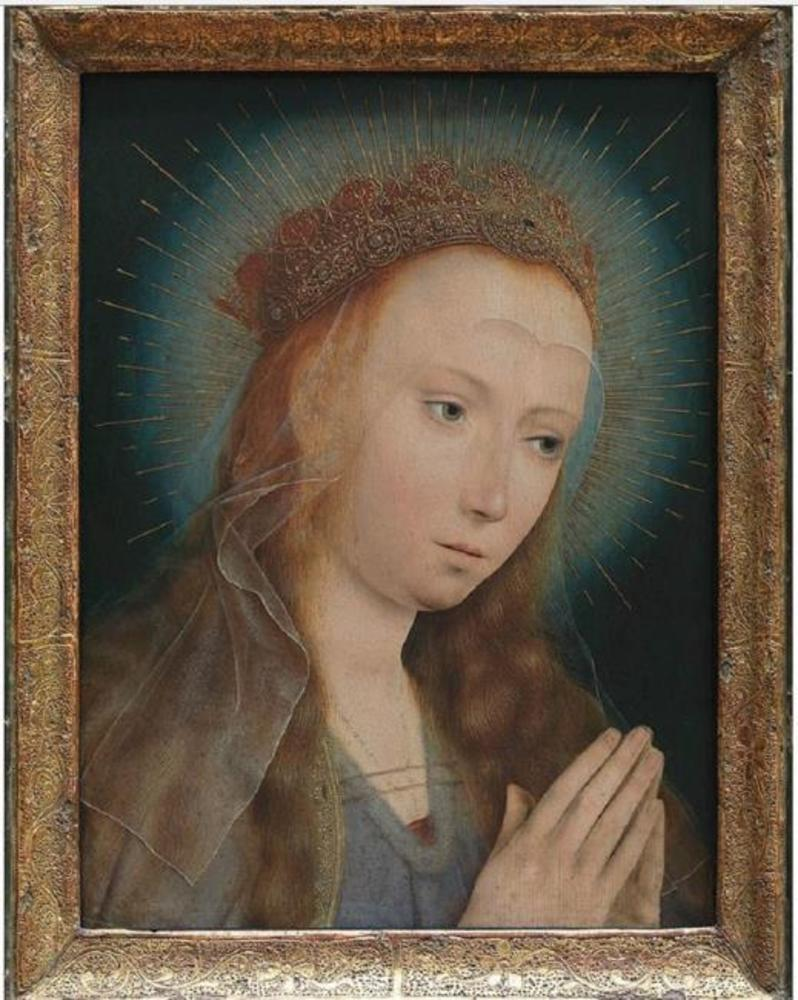
Biddende Maria by Quentin Matsys. c. 1505

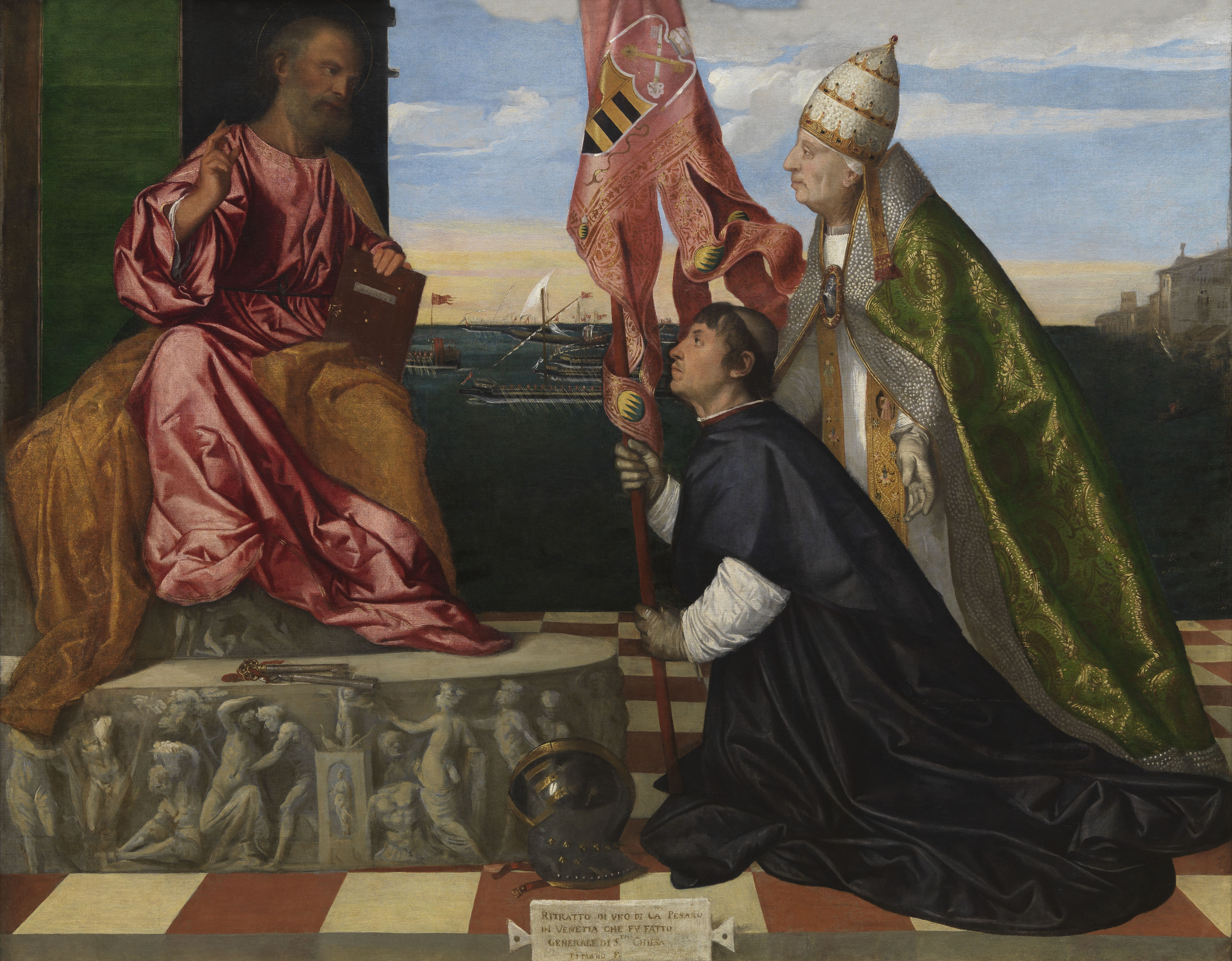
Jacopo Pesaro, bishop of Paphos, being presented by Pope Alexander VI to Saint Peter by Titian. 1503 - 1510

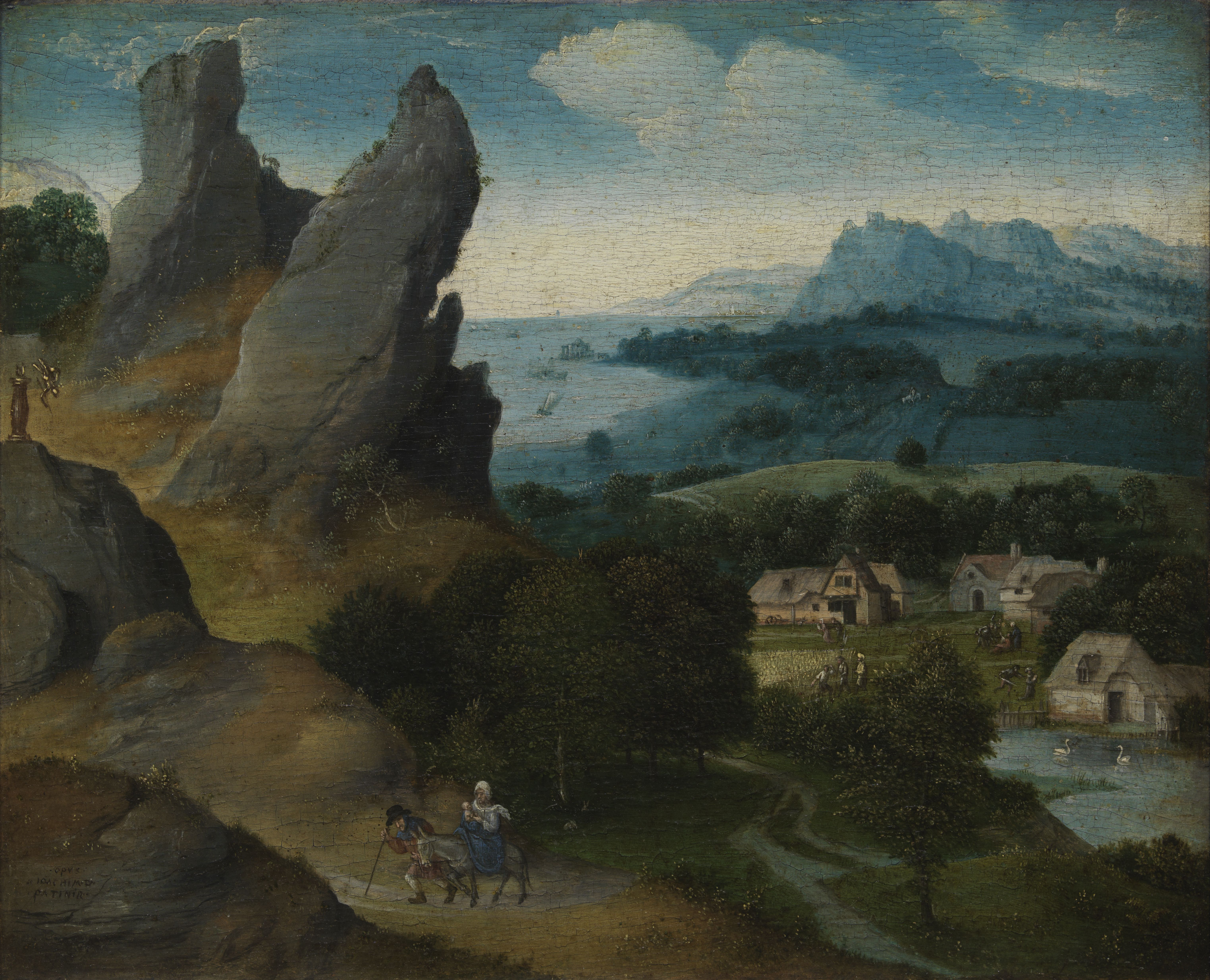
Landscape with the Flight into Egypt by Joachim Patinir. c. 1515

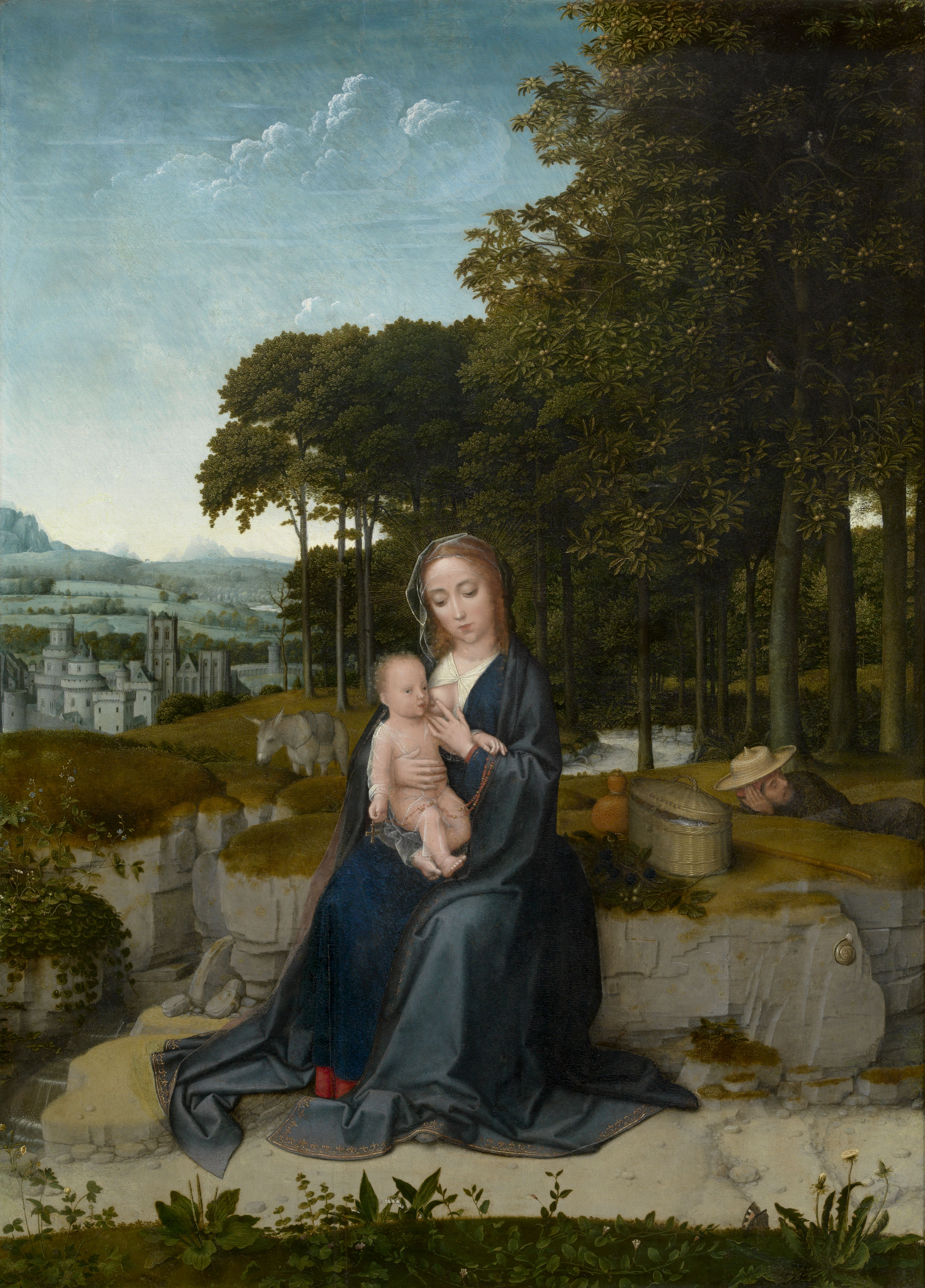
Rest on the Flight into Egypt by Gerard David. 16th century

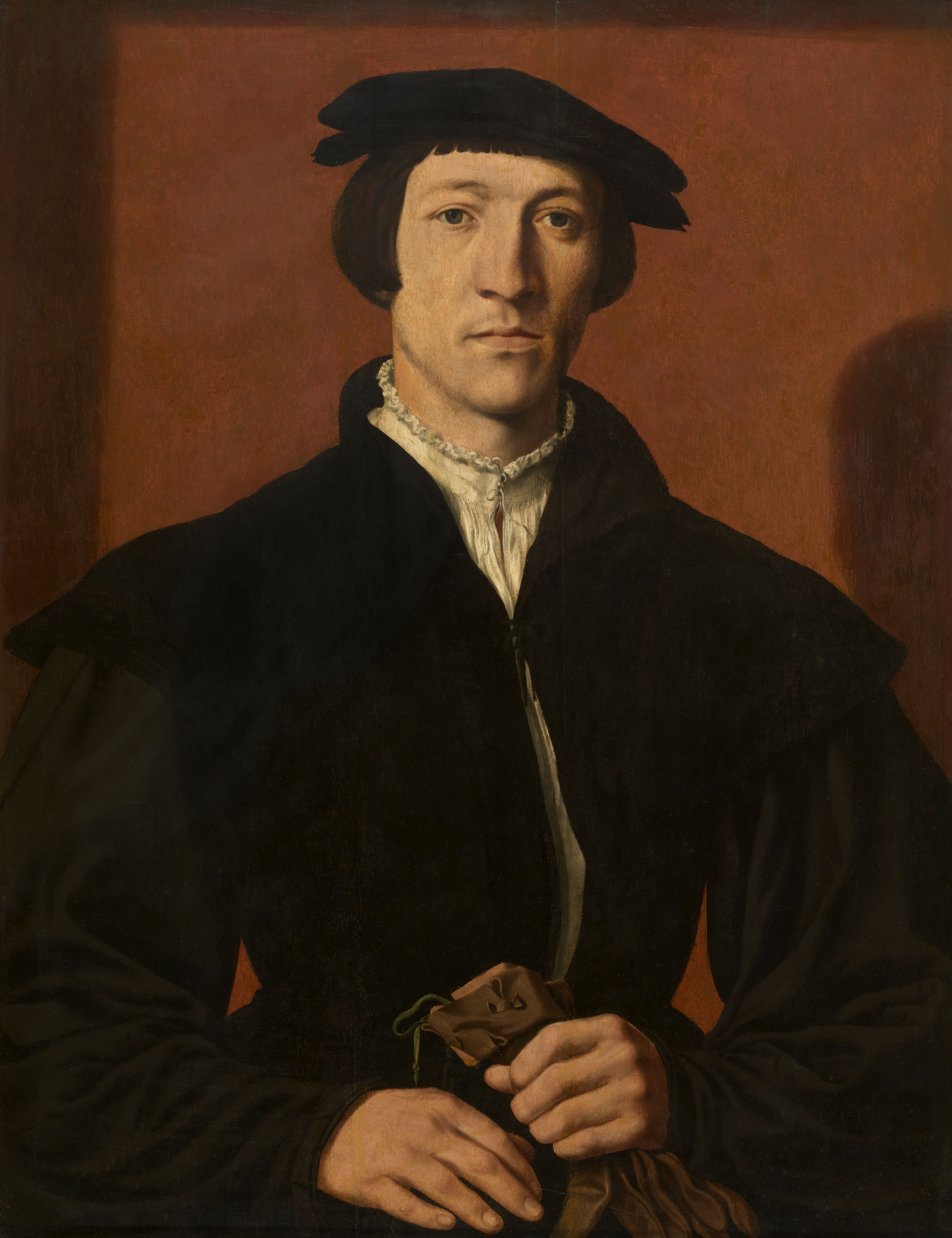
Portrait of a Man by Maarten van Heemskerck. 16th century

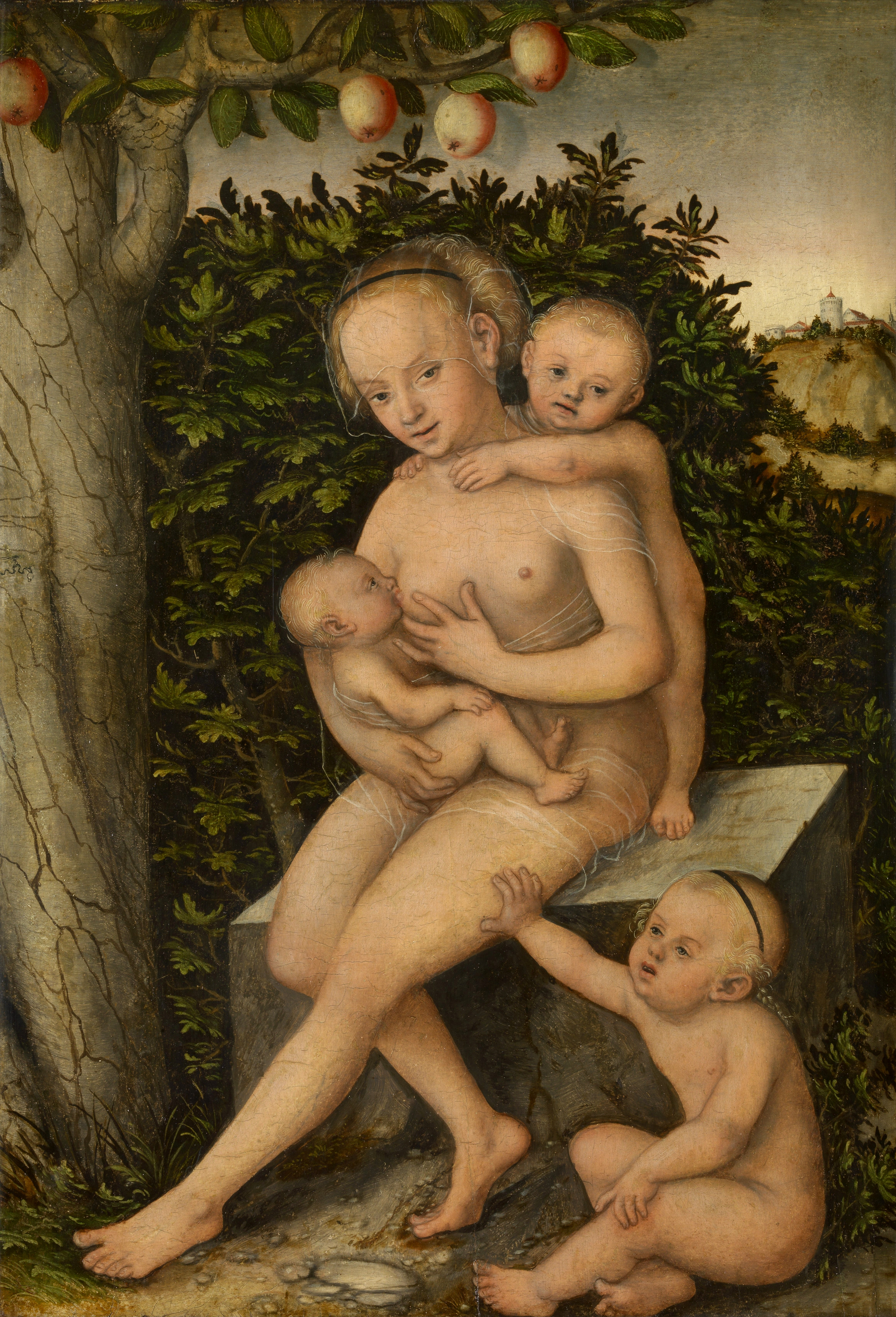
Caritas (Lucas Cranach the Elder) by Lucas Cranach the Elder. c. 1537

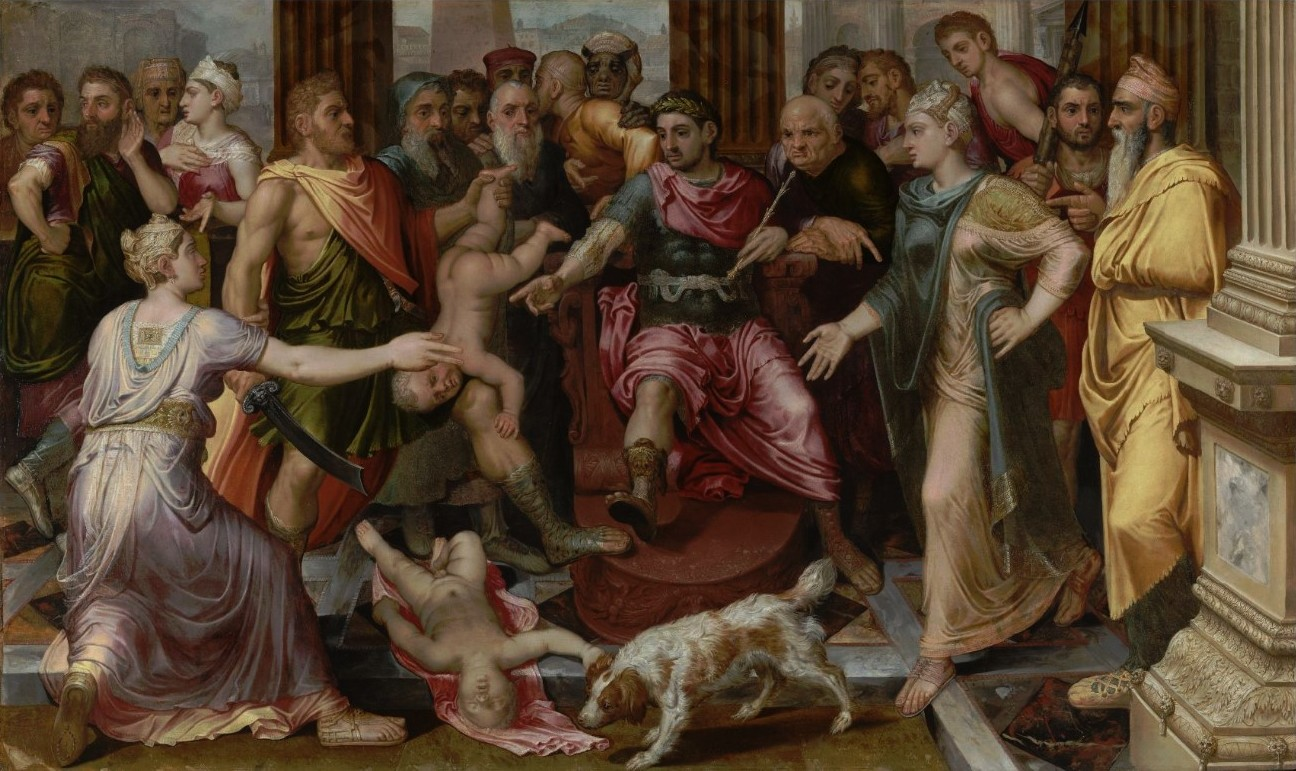
The Judgement of Solomon by Frans Floris. c. 1547

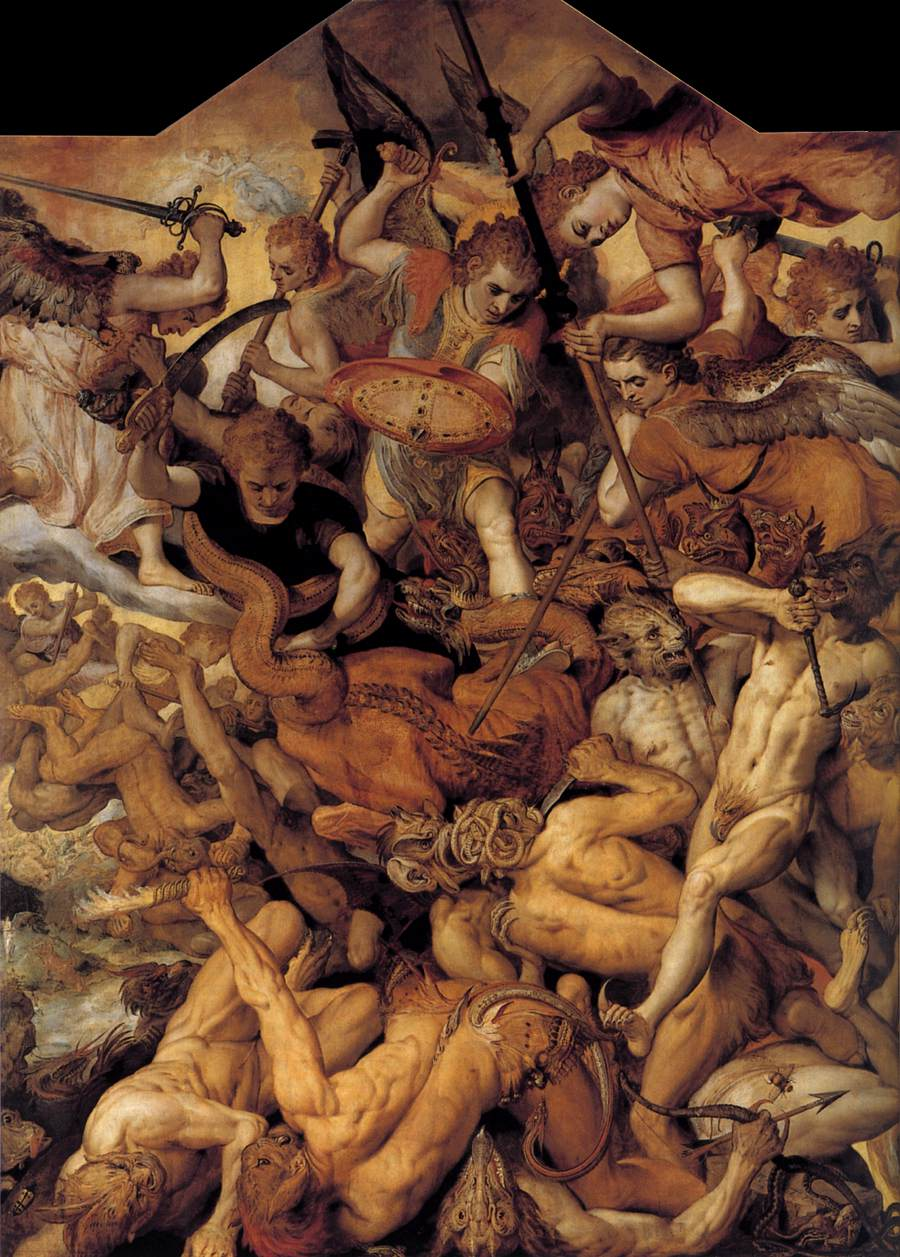
The Fall of the Rebel Angels by Frans Floris. 1554

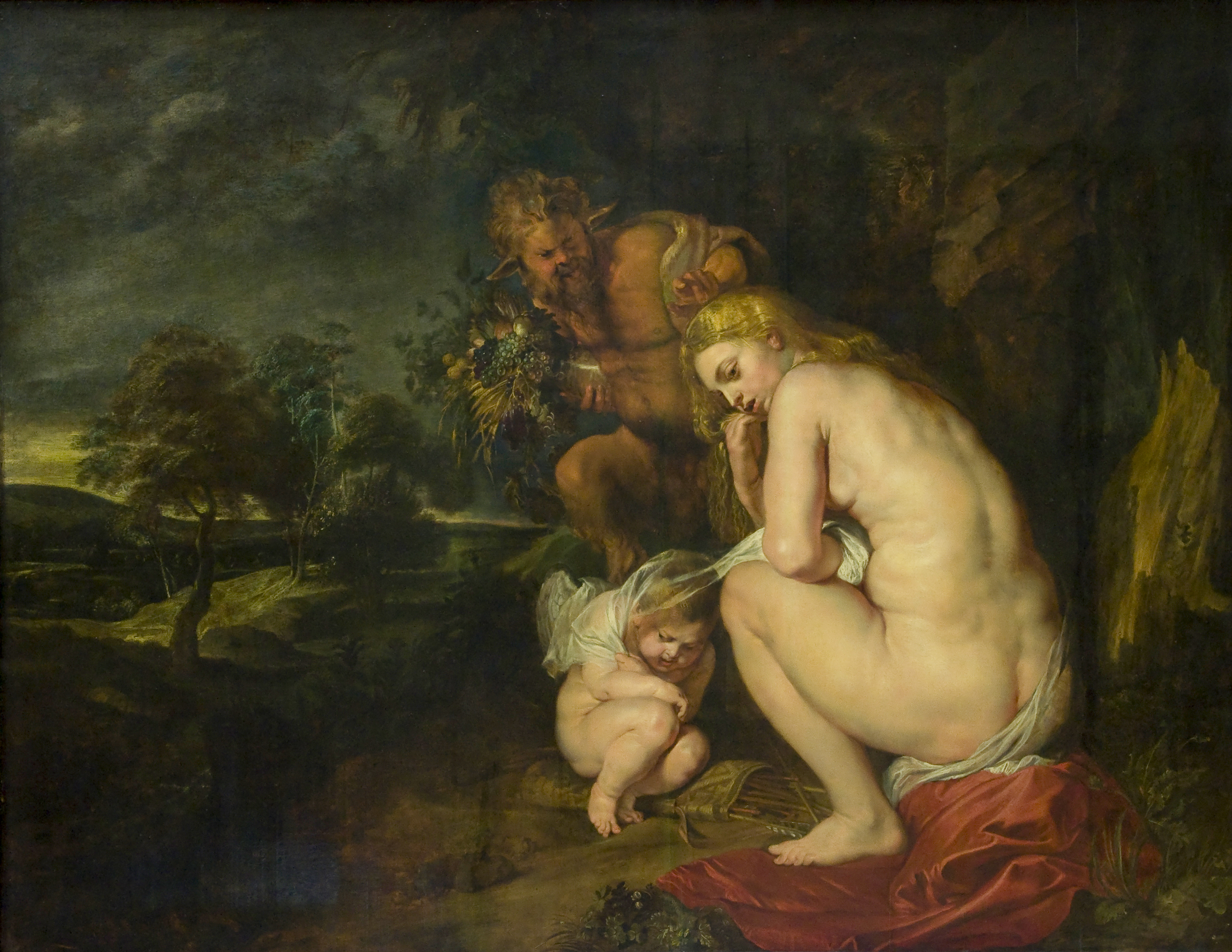
Venus Frigida by Peter Paul Rubens. 1611

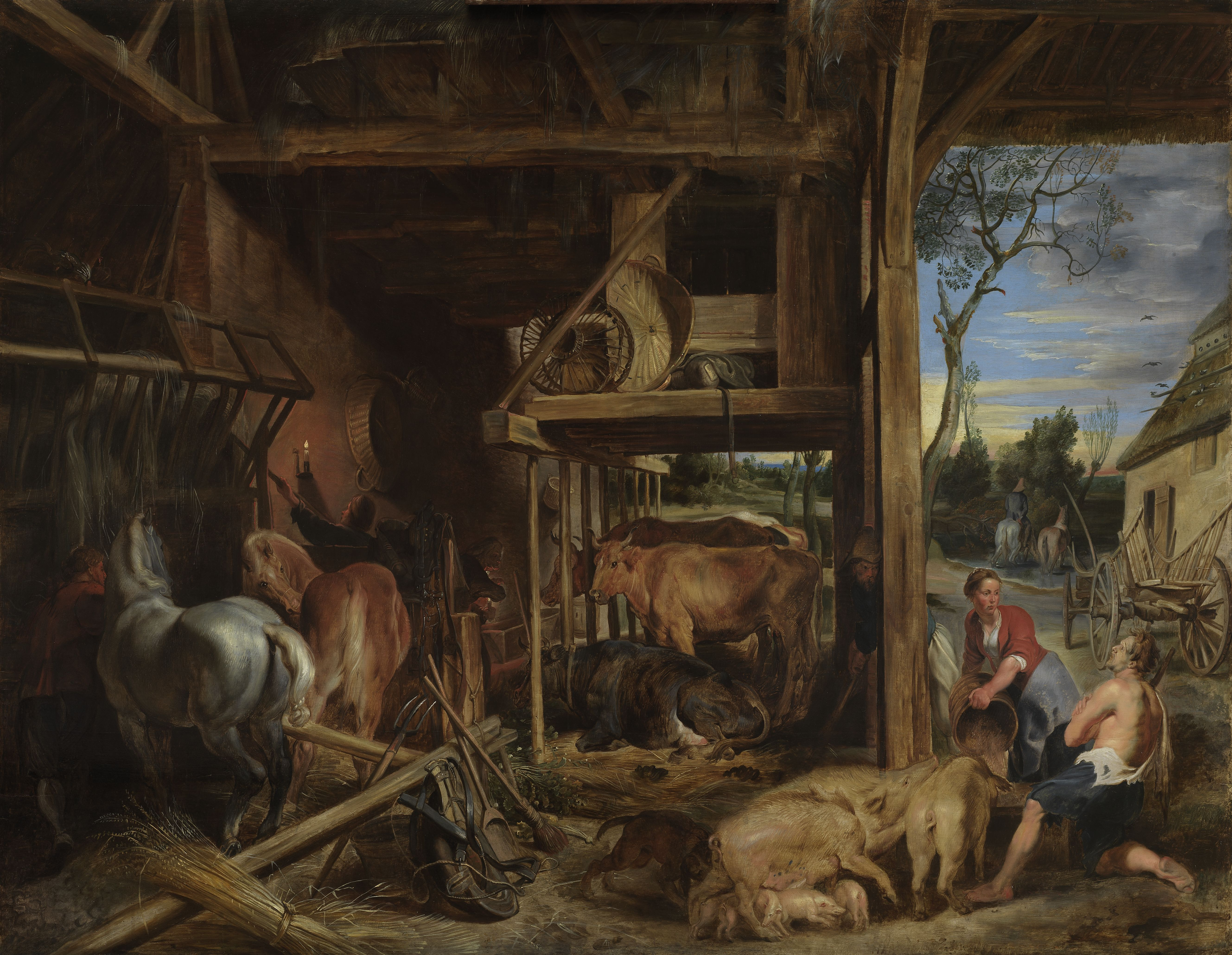
The Prodigal Son by Peter Paul Rubens. 1618

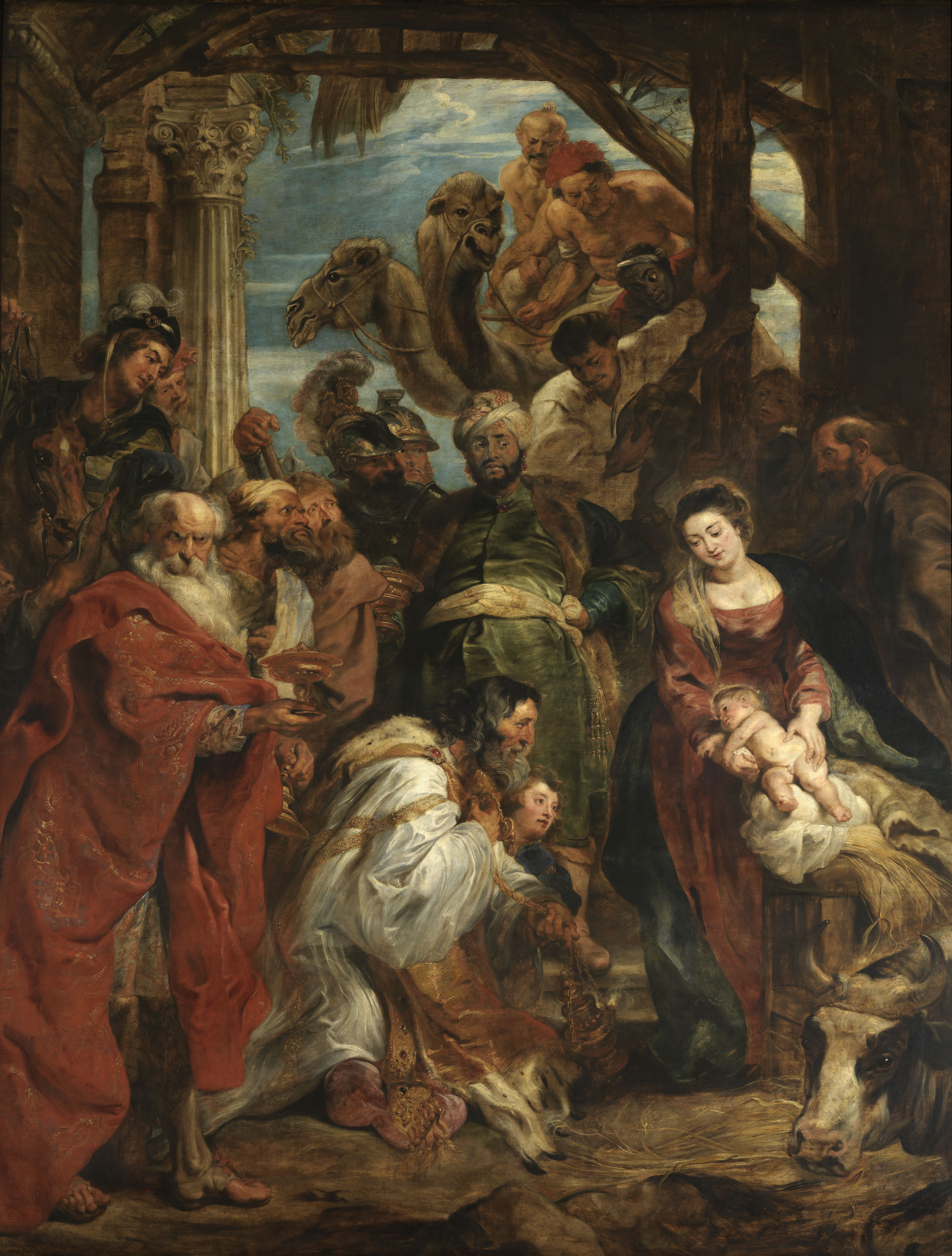
Adoration of the Magi by Peter Paul Rubens. c. 1626

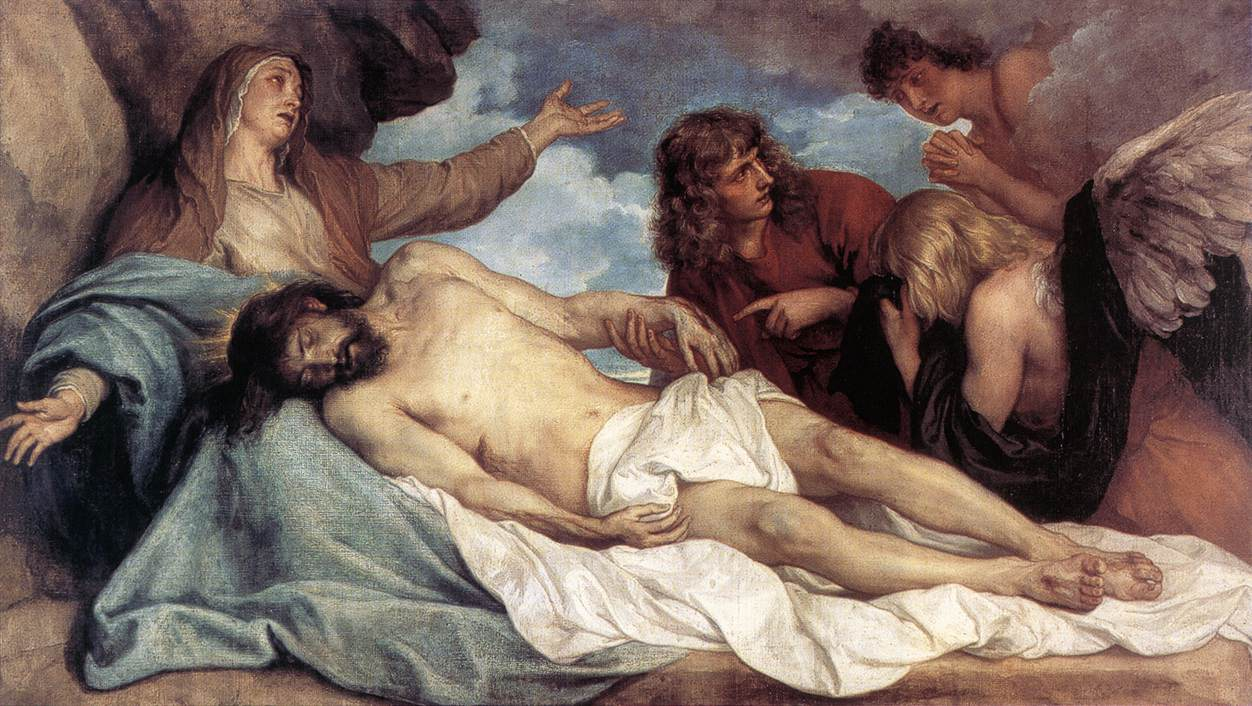
The Lamentation over the dead Christ by Anthony van Dyck. c. 1635

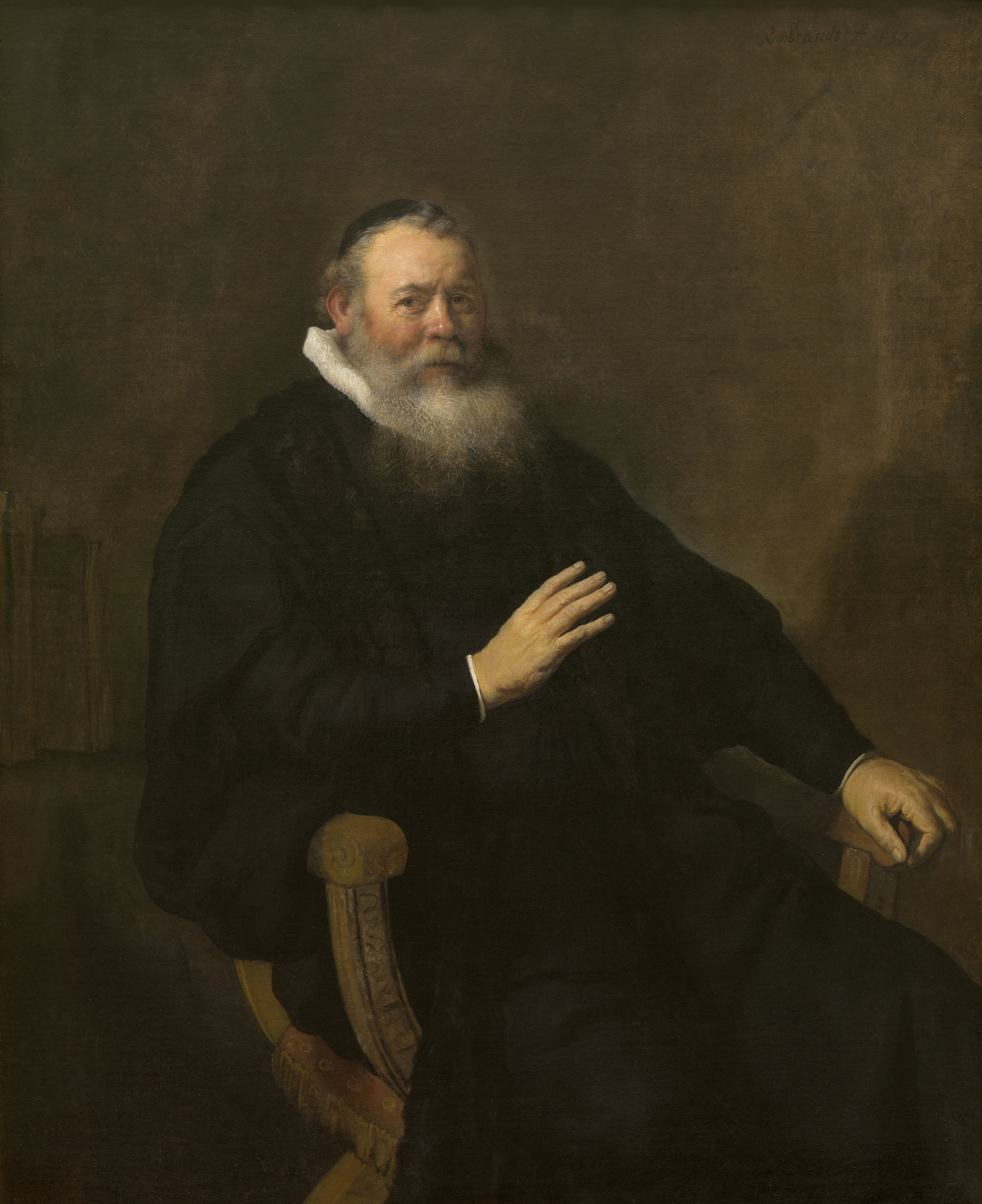
The Preacher Eleazar Swalmius by Rembrandt. 1637

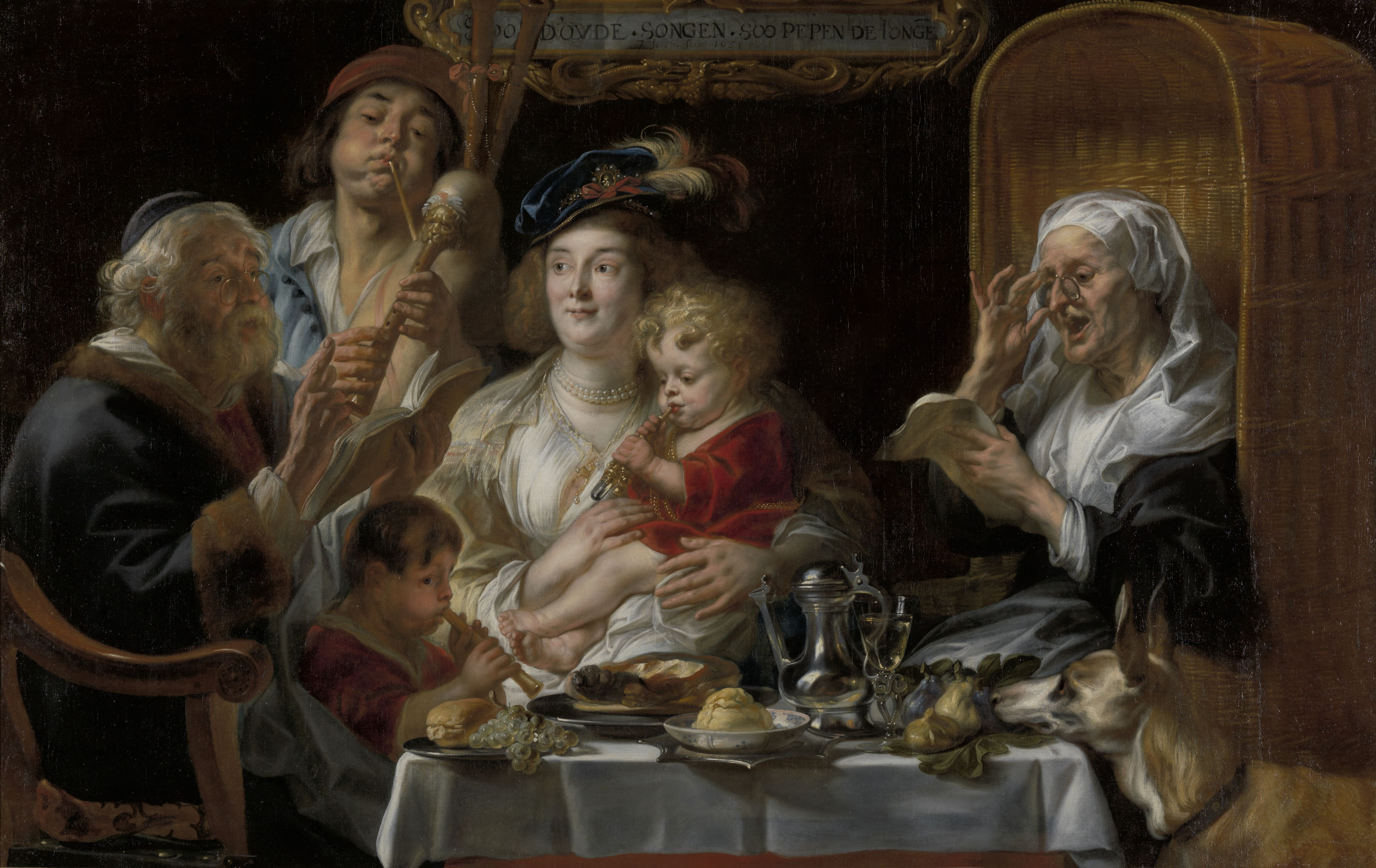
The Old Folks Sing, The Young Folks Pipe by Jacob Jordaens. 1638

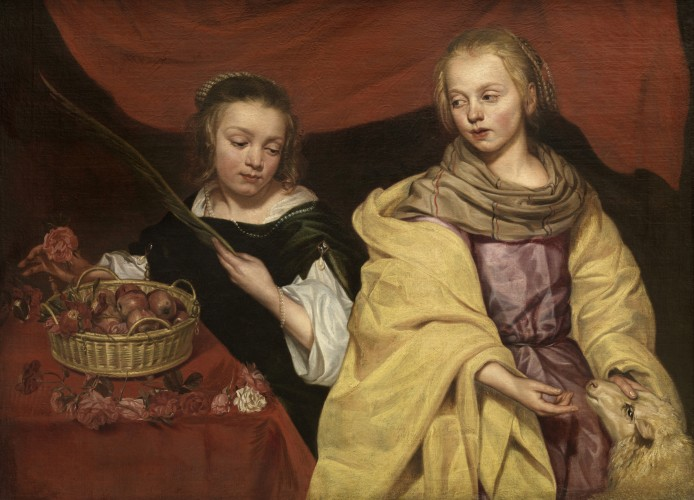
Two Girls as Saint Agnes and Saint Dorothea by Michaelina Wautier. c. 1650

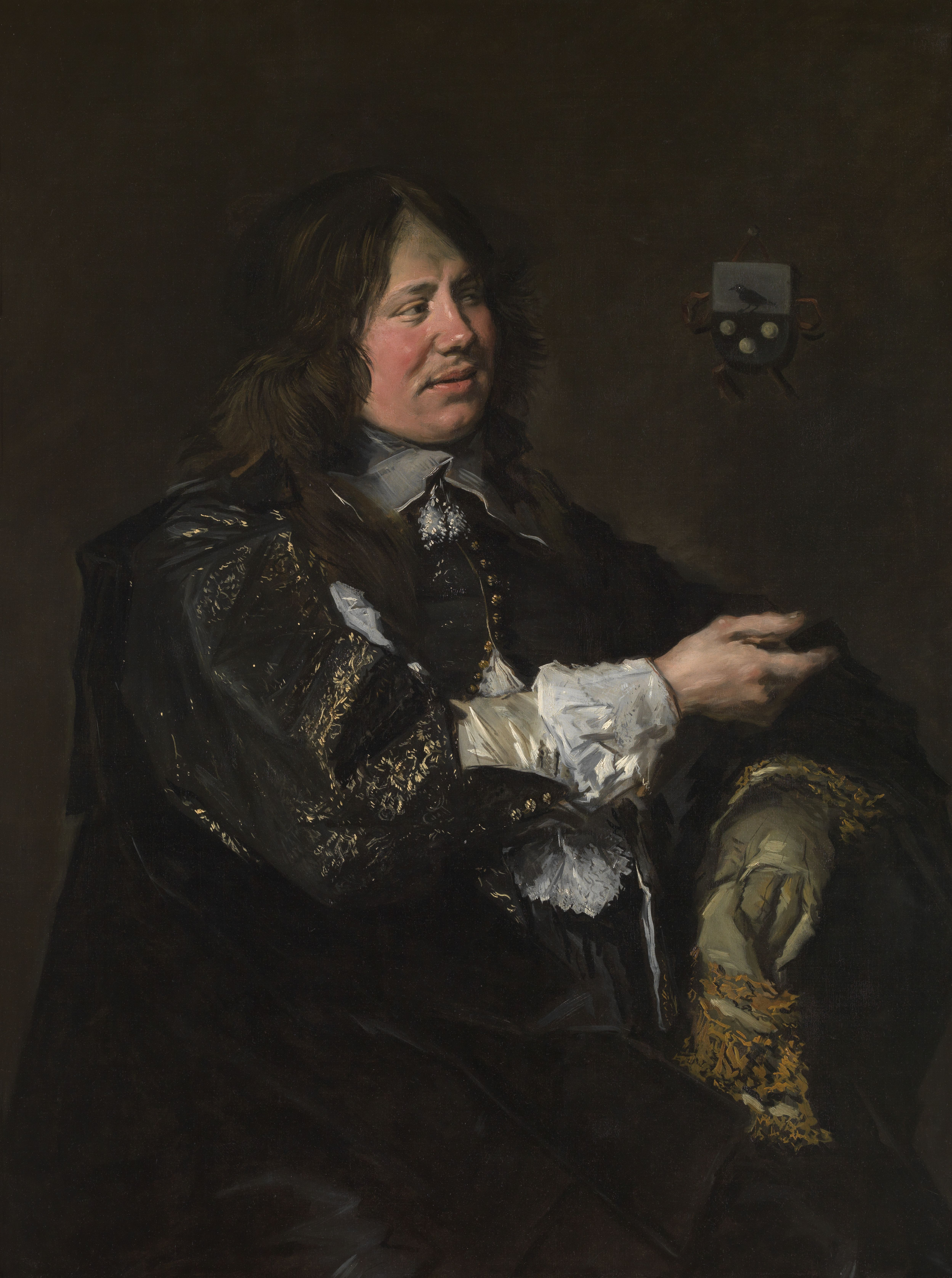
Portrait of Stephan Geraedts, Husband of Isabella Coymans by Frans Hals. 1650–1652

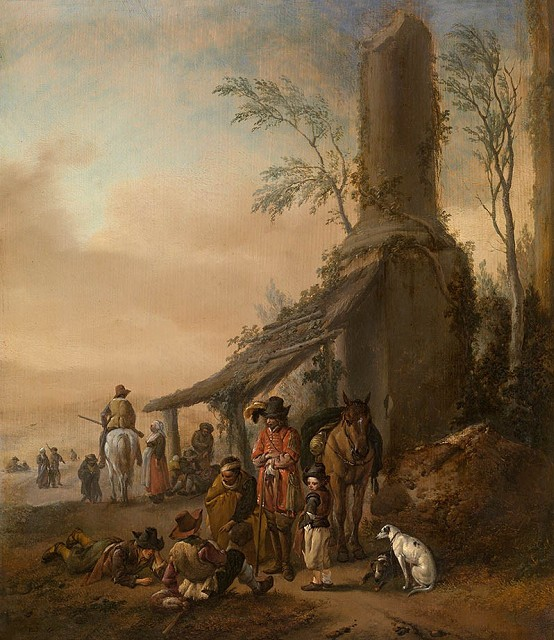
The Rider's Halting Place by Philips Wouwerman. 17th century

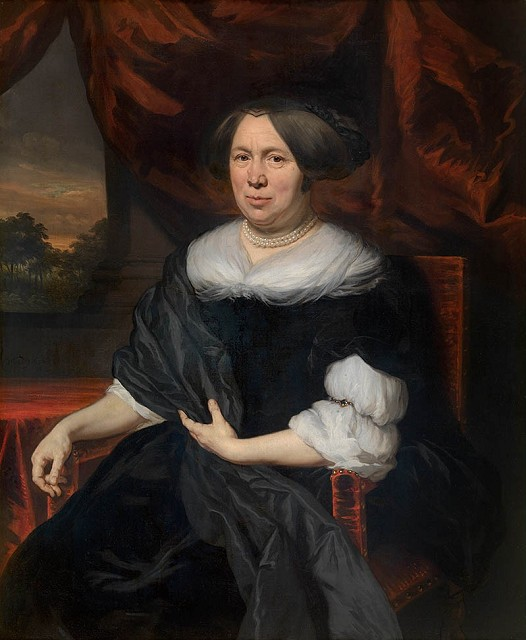
Portrait of a Seated Woman by Nicolaes Maes. 1676

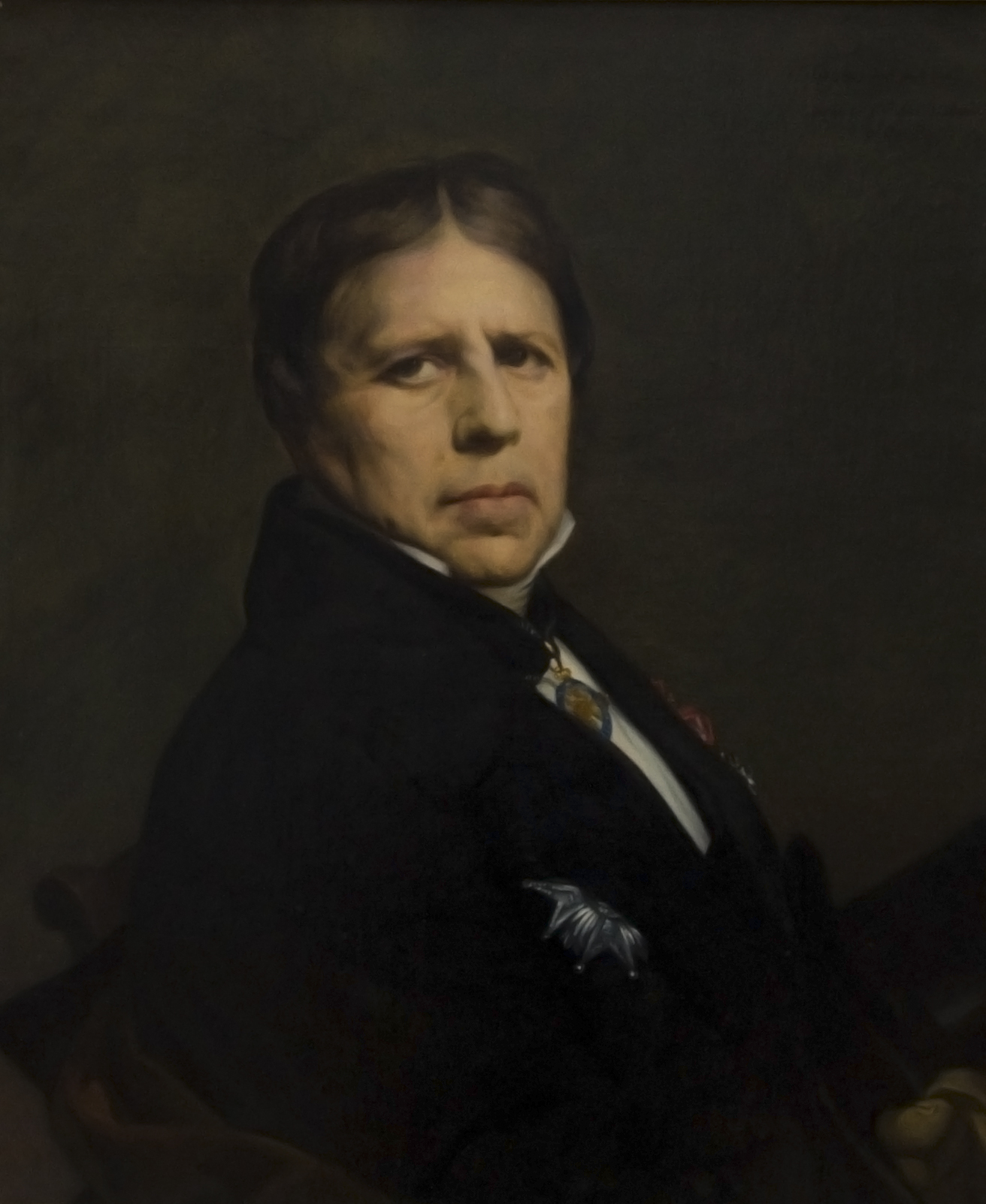
Self portrait by Jean-Auguste-Dominique Ingres. c. 1864

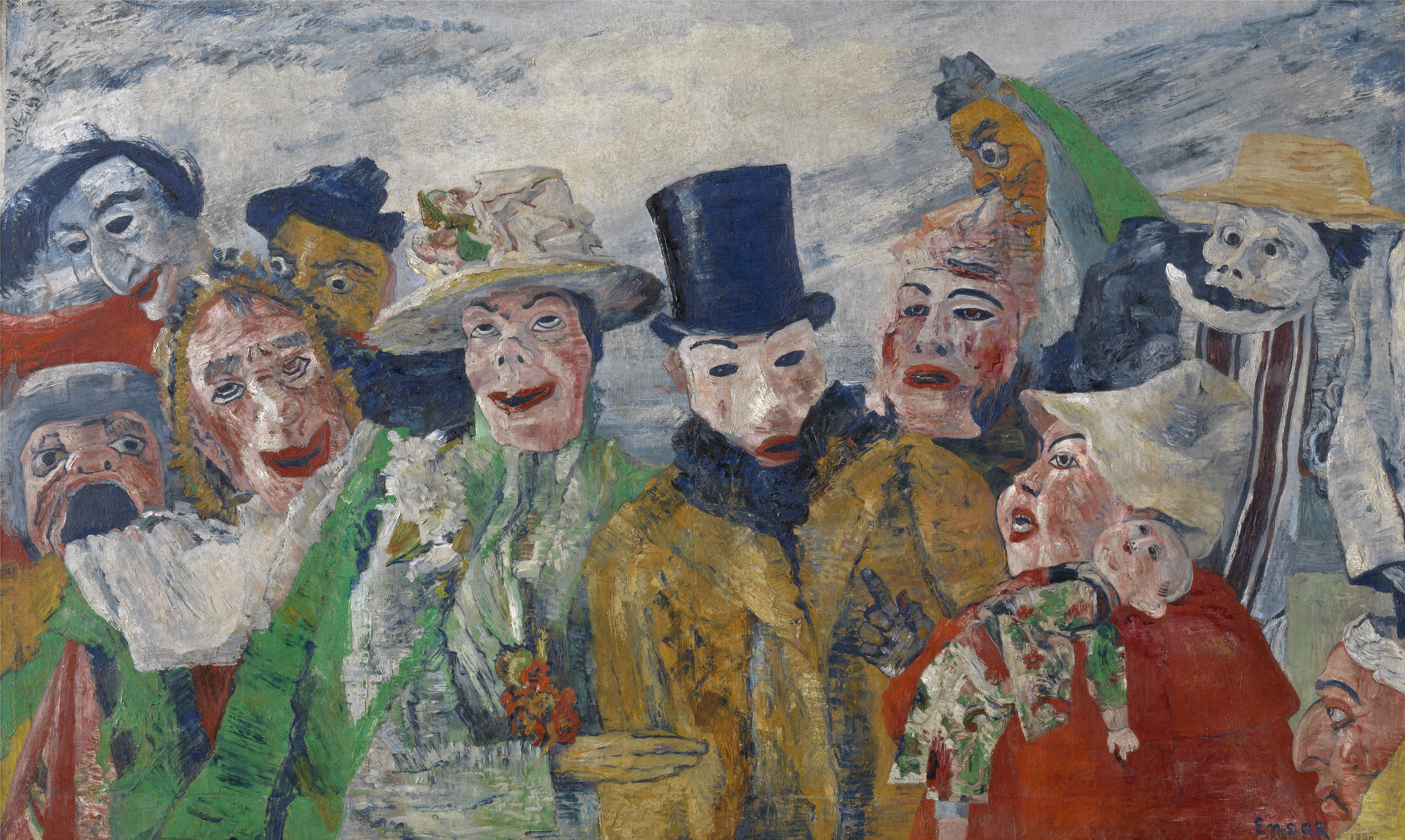
The Intrigue by James Ensor. 1890

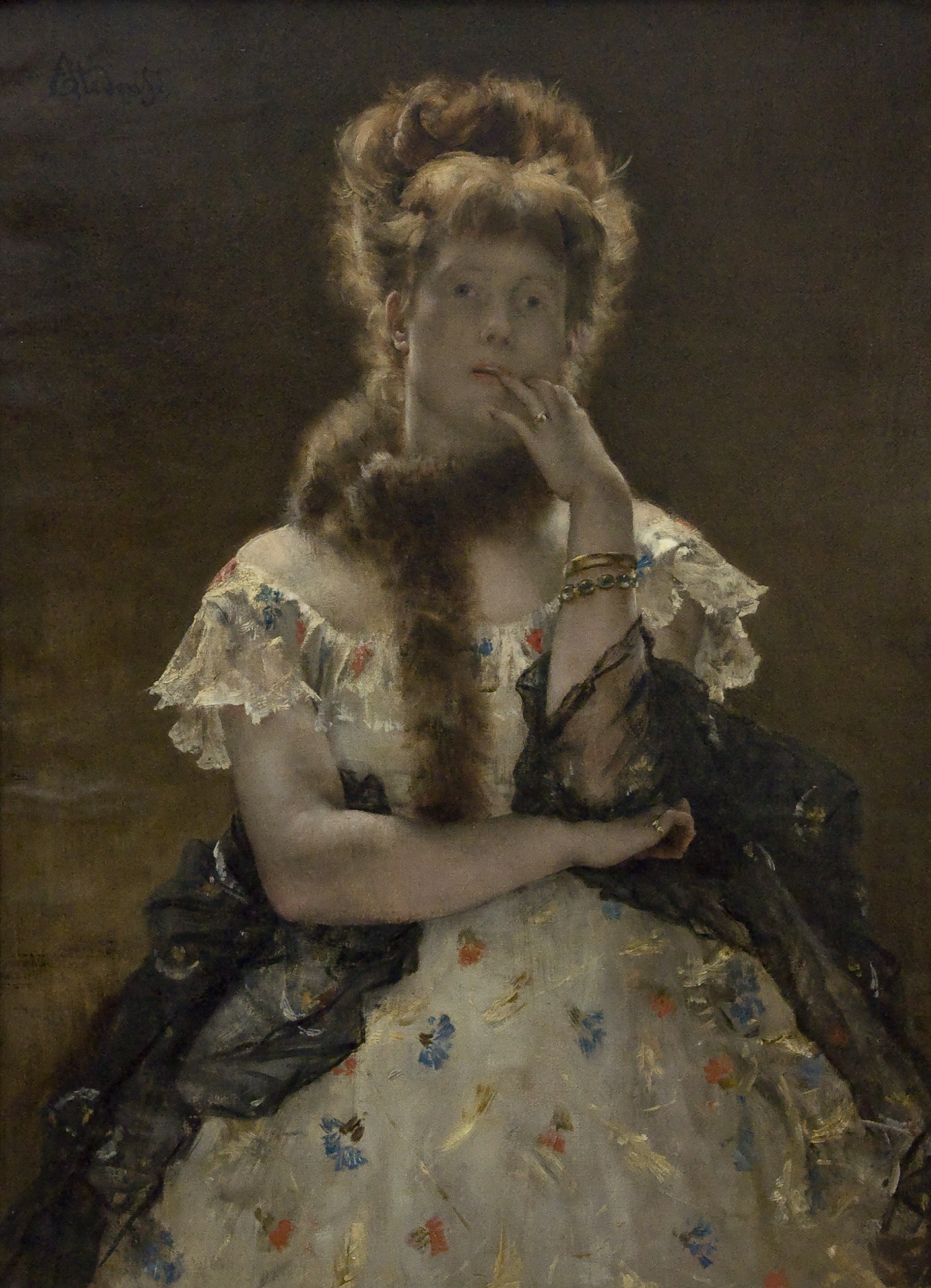
The Parisian Sphinx by Alfred Stevens. 1875–1877

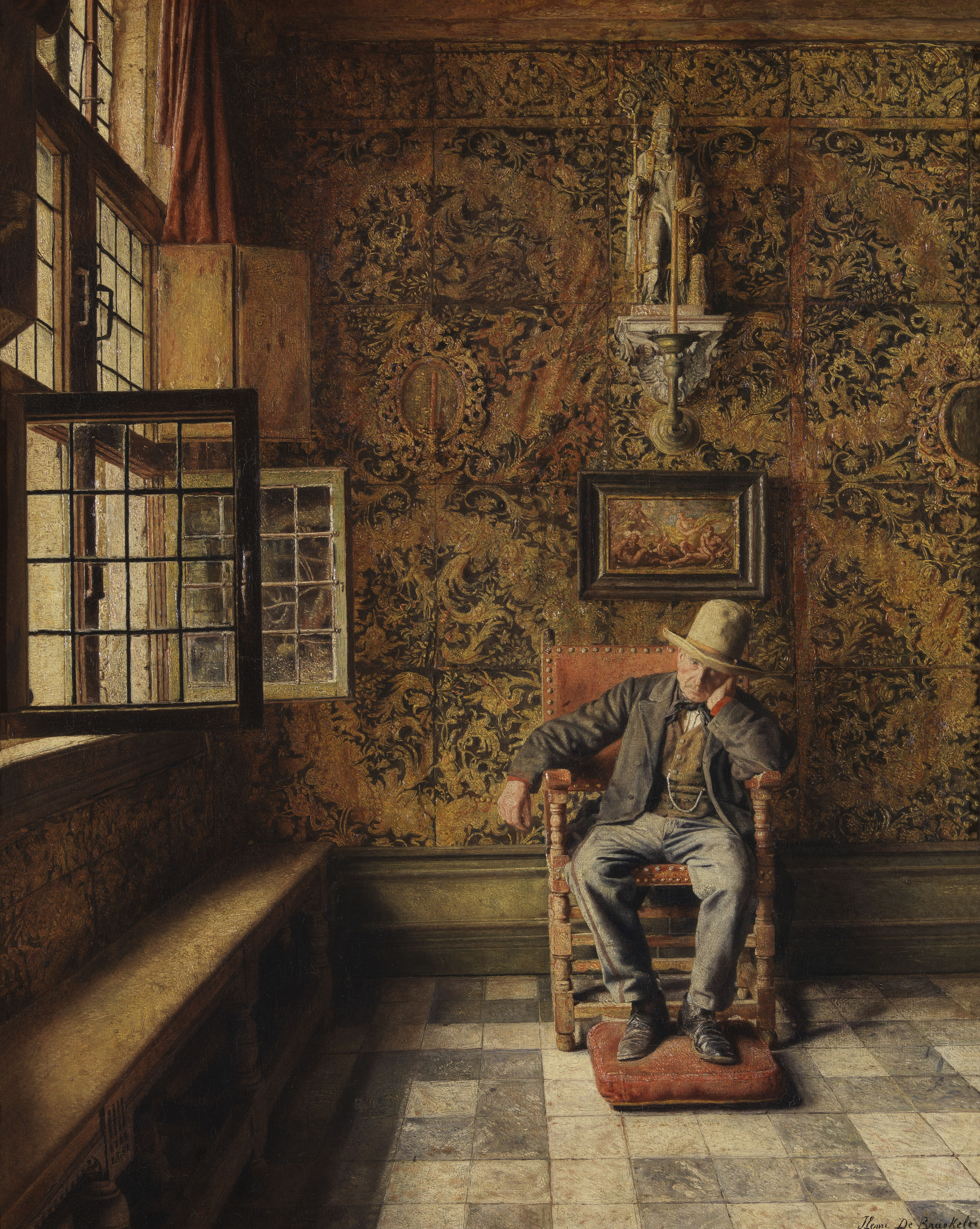
The Man in the Chair by Henri de Braekeleer. 1875

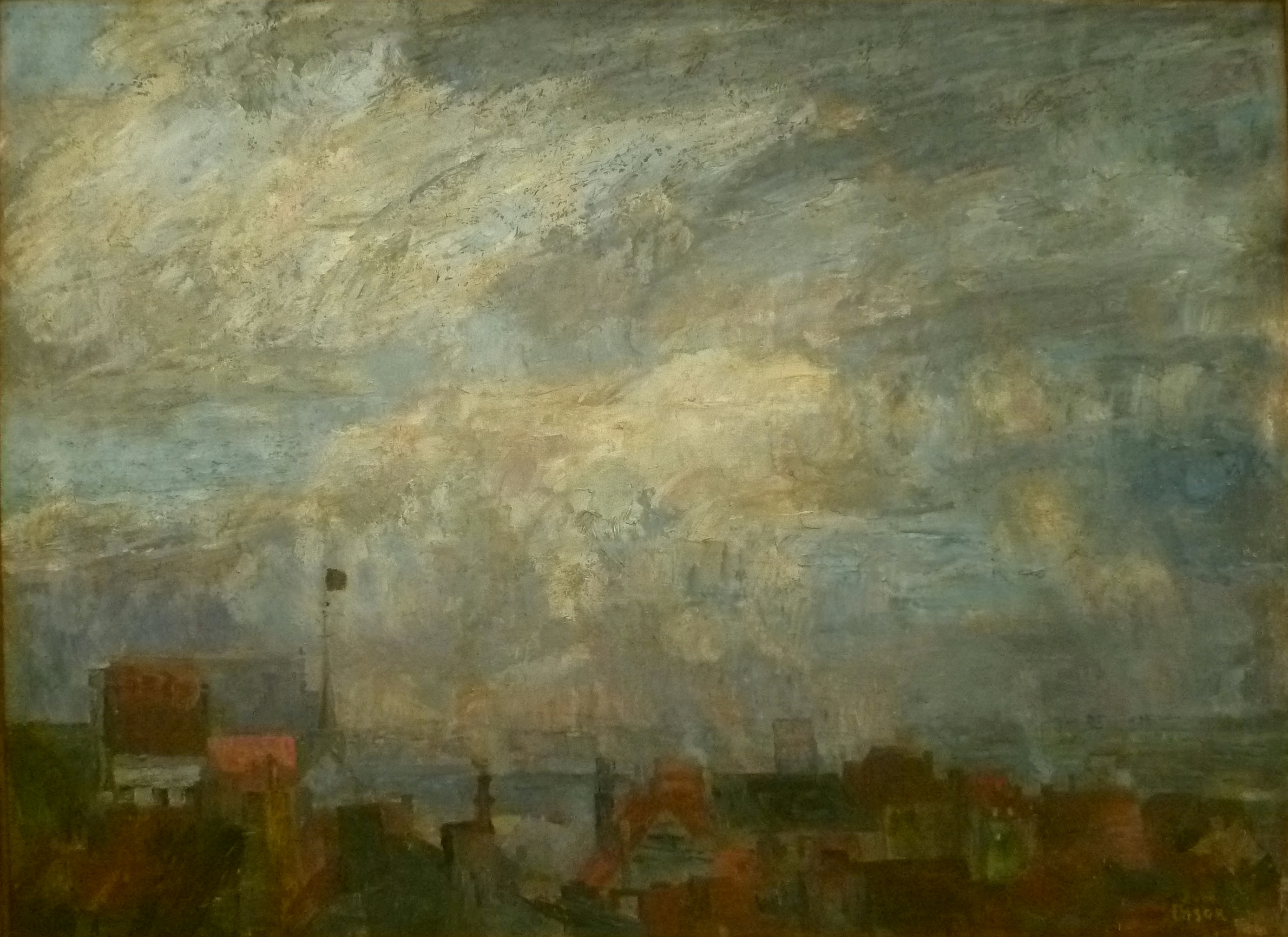
The Rooftops of Ostend by James Ensor. 1884

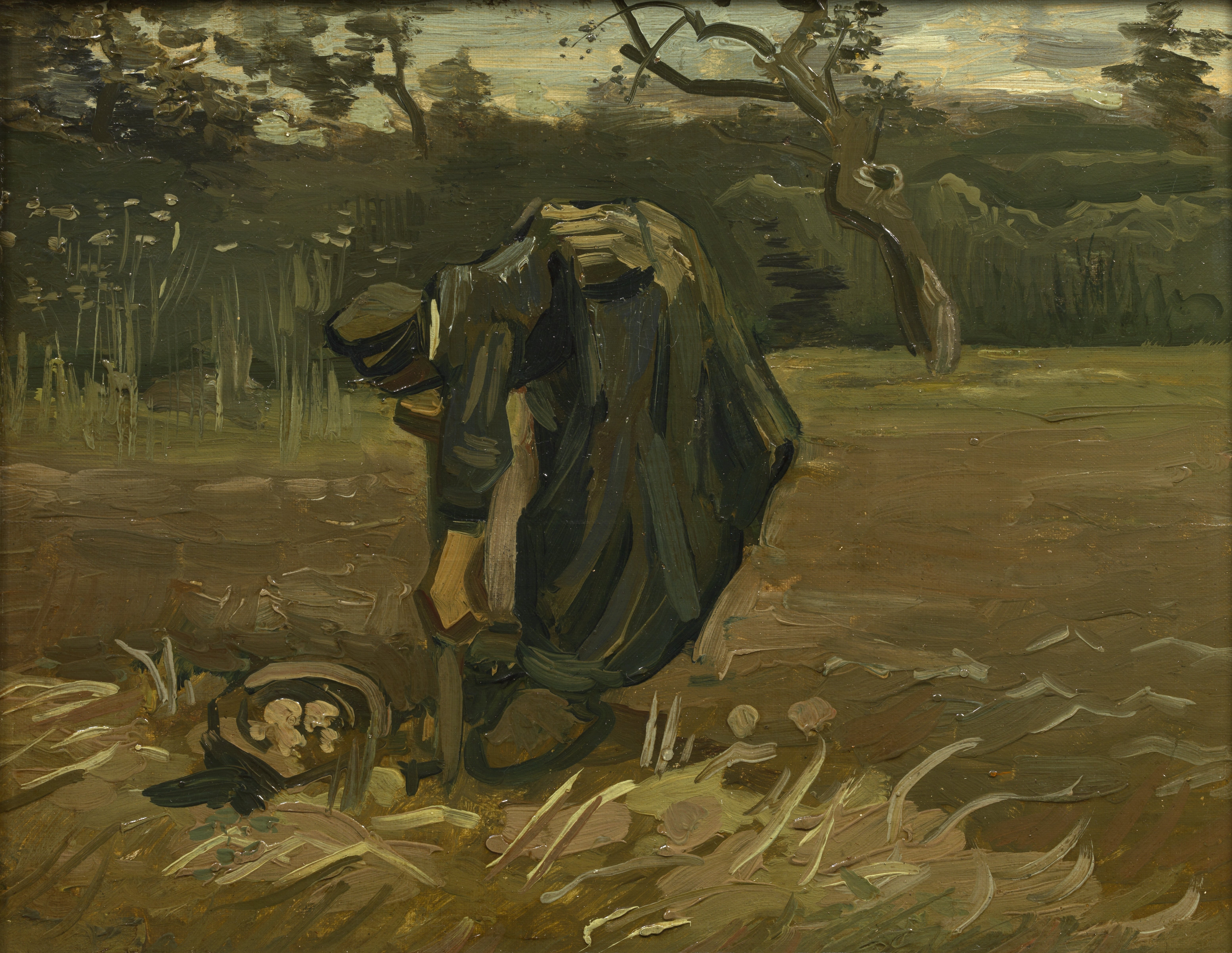
Peasant Woman Digging Up Potatoes by Vincent van Gogh. 1885

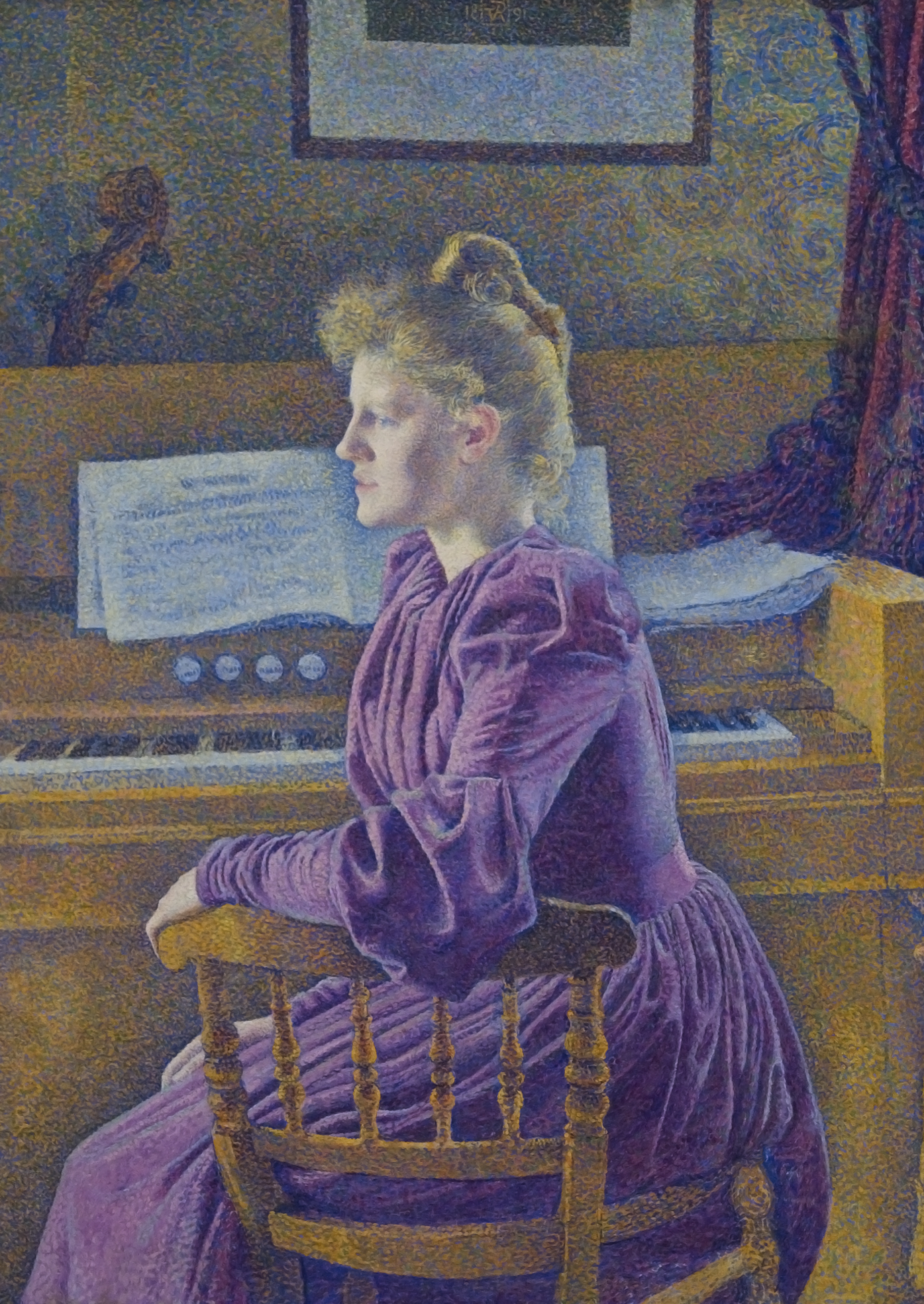
Maria Sèthe, Afterwards Madame Henry Vande Velde by Théo van Rysselberghe. c. 1891

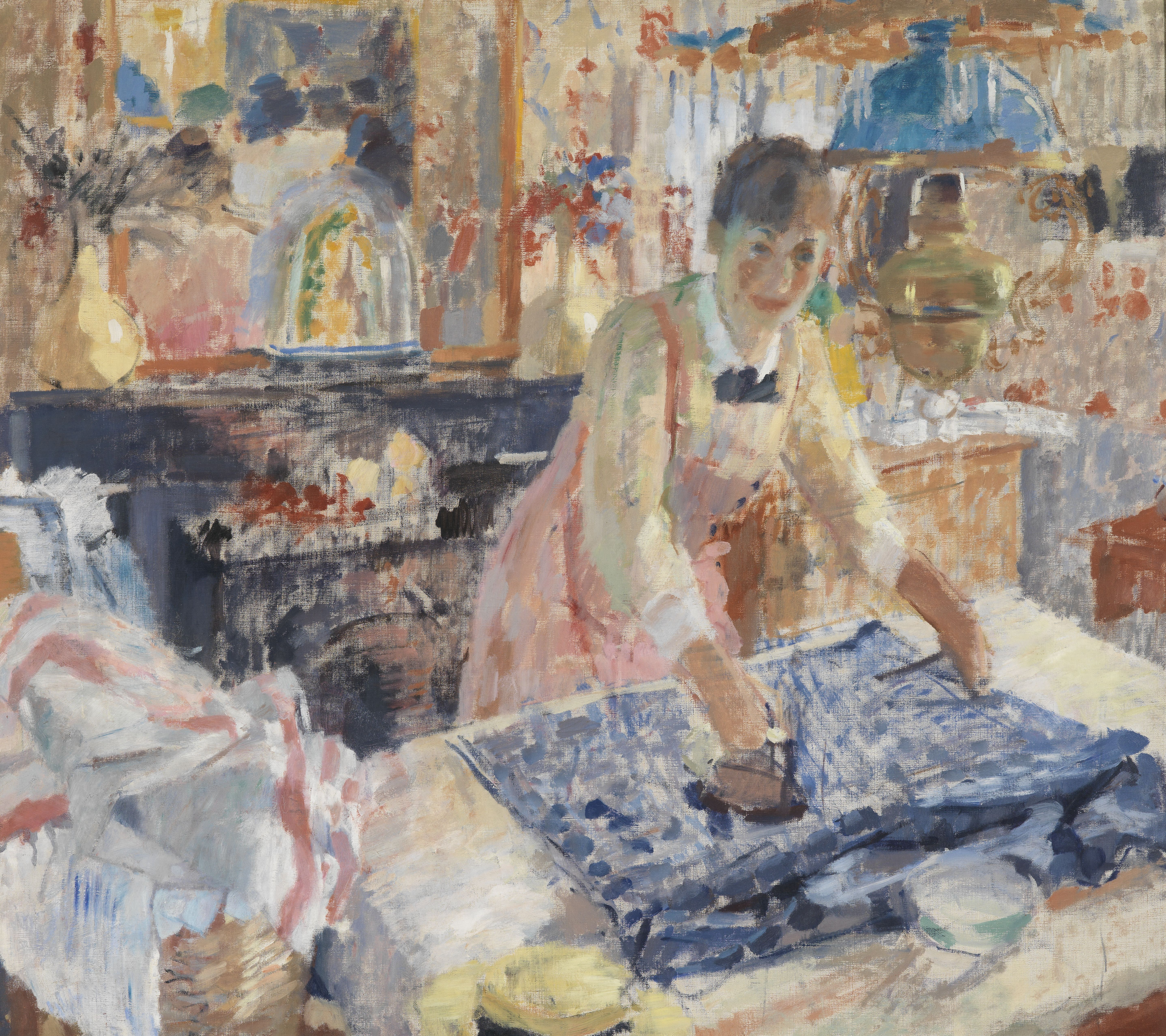
Ironing by Rik Wouters. 1912

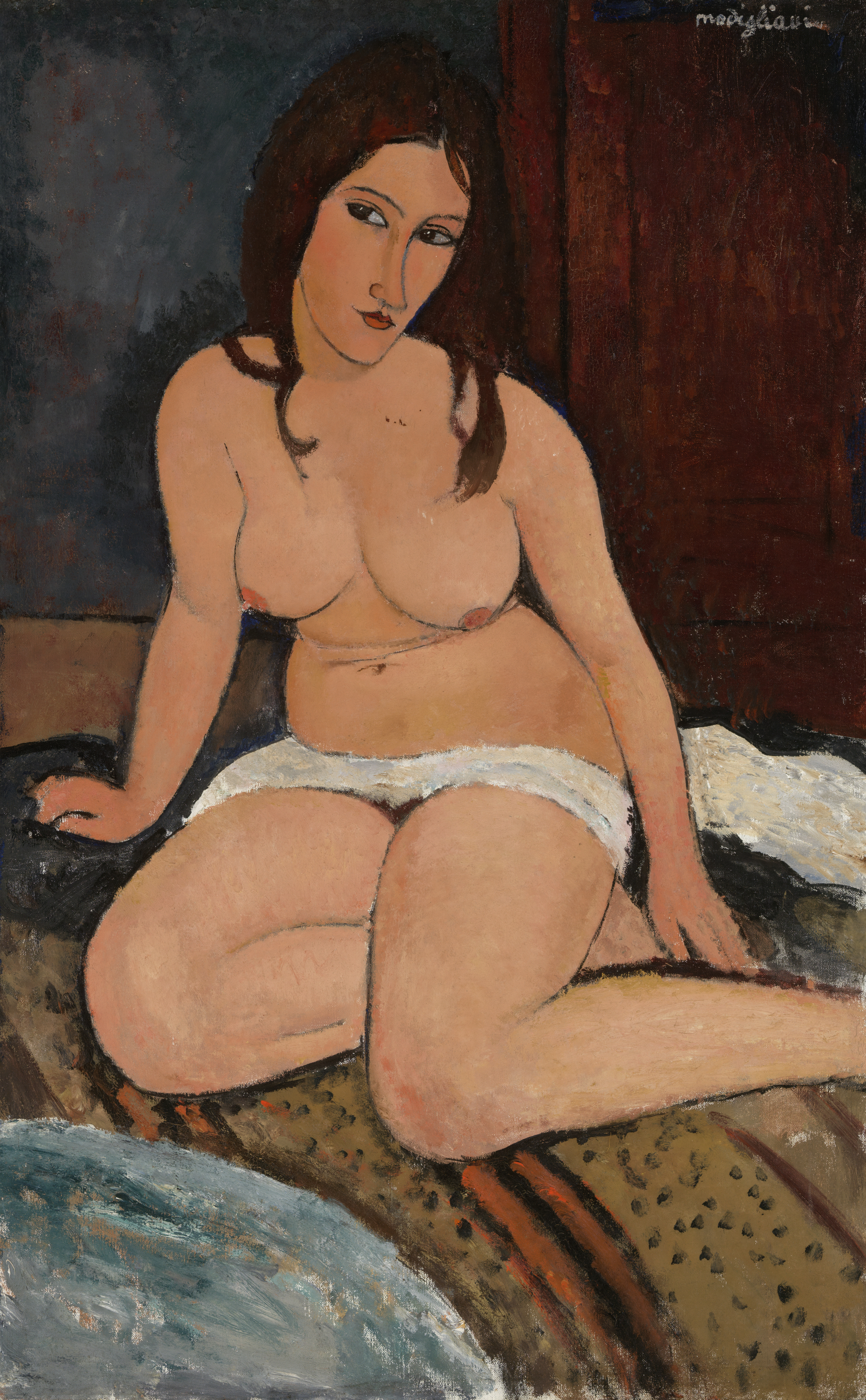
Sitting Nude by Amedeo Modigliani. 1917

== See also ==
- Pride and Joy: Children's Portraits in The Netherlands 1500-1700 art exhibition held by the Royal Museum of Fine Arts Antwerp in 2001
