= Portrait of a Seated Woman =

Painting by Nicolaes Maes

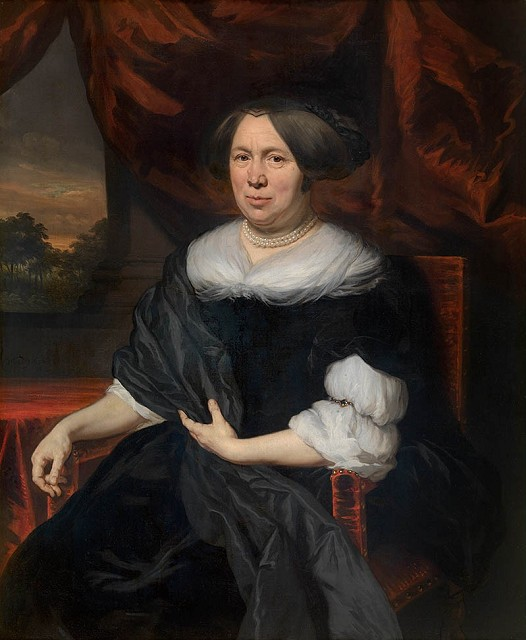
- Artist: Nicolaes Maes
- Year: 17th century (1653-1693)
- Catalogue: 888
- Medium: Oil on canvas
- Dimensions: 112.5 cm × 91.5 cm (44.3 in × 36 in)
- Location: Royal Museum of Fine Arts Antwerp; Antwerp

Portrait of a Seated Woman is an oil-on-canvas painting by Dutch painter Nicolaes Maes. Its date of execution is unknown. It measures 112.5 x 91.5 cm, and is currently housed at the Royal Museum of Fine Arts in Antwerp.

Maes, a pupil of Rembrandt, started his career as a painter of biblical and mythological subjects, genre paintings and portraits. His first recorded painting dates to 1653. He died in 1693.
