= Louvain-la-Neuve Cyclotron =

UCLouvain Cyclotron
- Cyclotron de Louvain-la-Neuve
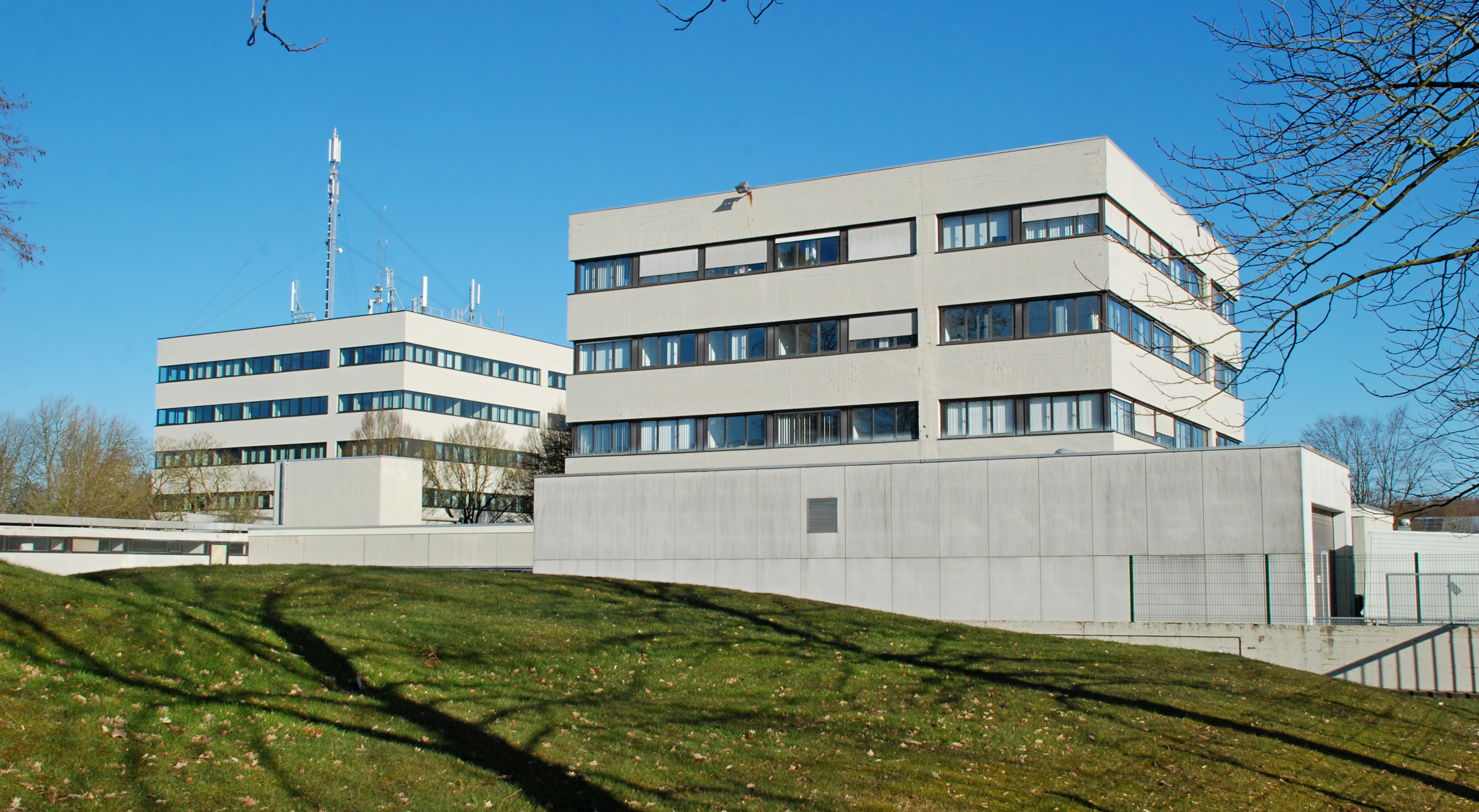
- The North and East towers.

- Location within Belgium

General information
- Architectural style: Brutalism
- Location: Louvain-la-Neuve, Chemin du Cyclotron 1, 1348 Louvain-la-Neuve, Louvain-la-Neuve, Belgium
- Coordinates: 50.665447°N 4.623661°E
- Construction started: 1970
- Completed: 1972
- Owner: UCLouvain

Height
- Height: 16 metres (52 ft) (accelerator tower)

Design and construction
- Architects: Roger Bastin, Guy Van Oost, Pierre Lamby

Other information
- Number of rooms: 192
- Parking: Parking Cyclotron; Parking Baudouin I

Website
- www.cyc.ucl.ac.be

The Louvain-la-Neuve Cyclotron is a brutalist architectural complex of the University of Louvain built from 1970 to 1972 in Louvain-la-Neuve, Walloon Brabant, Belgium, notably holding UCLouvain's CYCLONE particle accelerators. It is the first building completed by the university when it moved following the Leuven crisis and was the largest cyclotron in Europe at the time of its construction. The Louvain Cyclotron can also refer to Belgium's first cyclotron built in Leuven in 1947, which was replaced by the Louvain-la-Neuve center.

In addition to two particle accelerators of the Cyclotron Research Center, the complex holds the UCLouvain Schools of Mathematics and Physics and corresponding research institutes, the Centre for Applied Molecular Technologies, the UCLouvain radiation protection service, a business incubator and a shared workspace.

== Location ==
The Cyclotron is located at number 1, Chemin du Cyclotron, in the east of Louvain-la-Neuve, between Boulevard Baudouin Ier, Avenue Louis de Geer and the Chemin du Cyclotron, and North of the Louvain-la-Neuve Science Park.

== History ==
=== First cyclotron in Heverlee ===
After the Second World War, under the impetus of Professor Marc de Hemptinne, the Catholic University of Louvain began the construction of a cyclotron for the acceleration of deuterons in Heverlee, a suburb of the city of Leuven. The Heverlee cyclotron was built in 1947 and inaugurated in 1952. From 1952 to 1959, it was used to produce radioactive isotopes and fast neutrons. Later, the cyclotron was used for the study of nuclear reactions and for spectroscopy of very short-lived states.

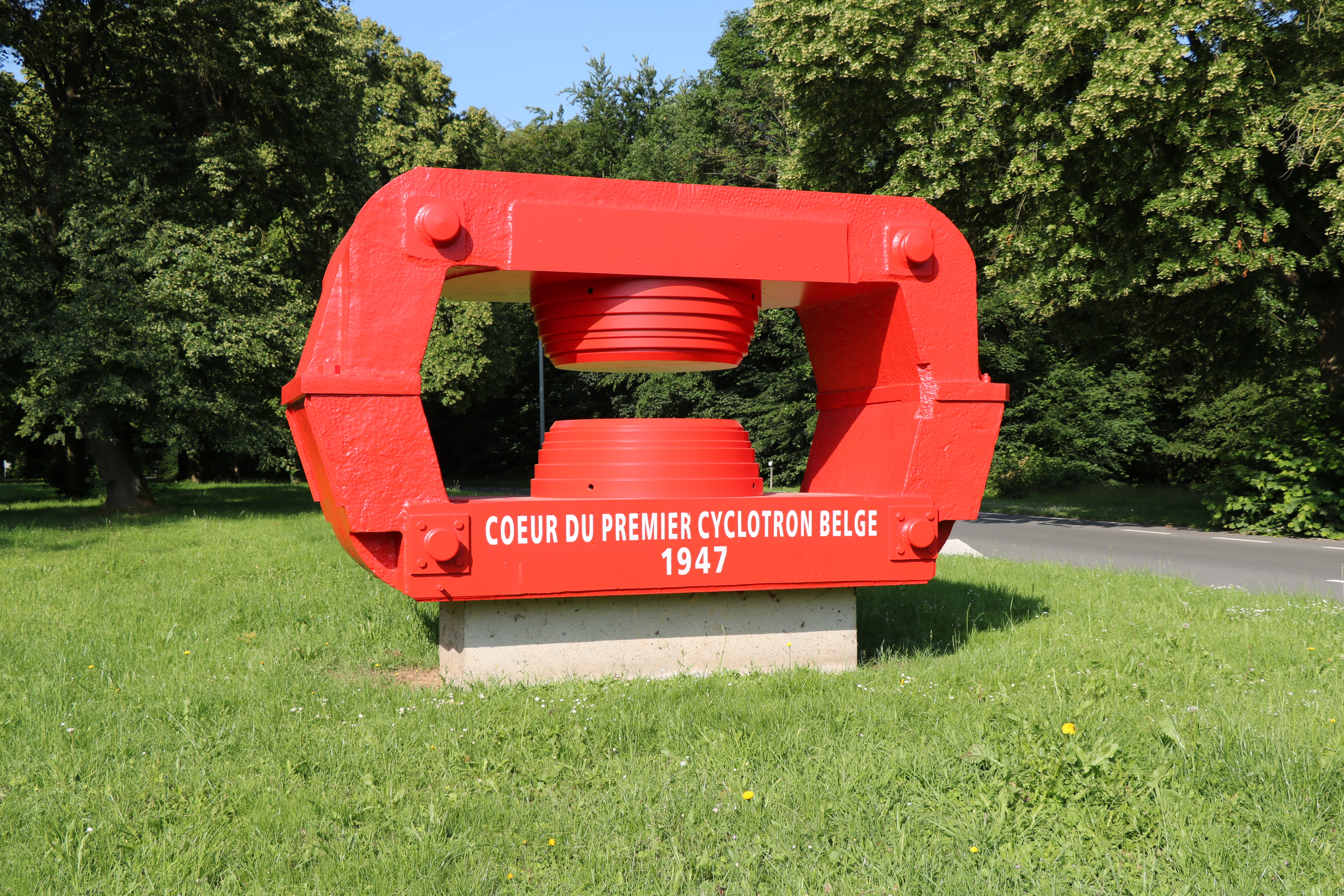
Core of Belgium's first cyclotron, built in Heverlee and resting in Louvain-la-Neuve.

It was replaced by the research center in Louvain-la-Neuve, where the core of this first Belgian cyclotron is still visible, installed as a monument in front of the new cyclotron. The 6m^{3} core has been painted red.

=== Construction of Louvain-la-Neuve ===
Louvain-la-Neuve undoubtedly ranks as the most ambitious of the towns built from scratch in Belgium. Forced to leave the city of Leuven during the Leuven crisis, the French-speaking part of the Catholic University of Leuven decided to move to a new location in 1968 on an agricultural plateau located North-East of Ottignies in Brabant, on the other side of Belgium's official language border, and started the construction of a new university town.

==== Construction of the Louvain-la-Neuve Cyclotron ====
As part of this move, the University of Louvain decided to build a new cyclotron, named CYCLONE (CYClotron de LOuvain-la-Neuve). In 1968, Roger Bastin, an architect inspired by the refined line of great names in modernism such as Le Corbusier in France and Alvar Aalto in Finland, provided the Université catholique de Louvain with a master plan for the new town. Bastin's master plan was not adopted, but in return, he was entrusted with the Cyclotron project, which he and his partners Guy Van Oost and Pierre Lamby would carry out. The Cyclotron is the very first construction site in Louvain-la-Neuve, and its development begun in 1970, while the foundation stone for the University's new main buildings was not laid until February 2, 1971. The Cyclotron also became the first completed building of Louvain-la-Neuve: its construction ended in 1971 and it was inaugurated in 1972, before the formal establishment of the town with its first inhabitants in October of the same year.

==== Cyclotron Research Center ====
The Cyclotron Research Centre was equipped in the early 1970s with a first particle accelerator called CYCLONE110, built by Thomson-CSF in collaboration with the Ateliers de constructions électriques de Charleroi (ACEC) and used for nuclear physics, isotope production, medical and technological applications. A second accelerator, called CYCLONE30, was designed and built by the Cyclotron Research Centre team between 1984 and 1987: mainly designed for industrial and medical applications, it is mainly used for isotope production. Further models of CYCLONE30 were built by Ion Beam Applications.

==== Yves Jongen and Ion Beam Applications ====
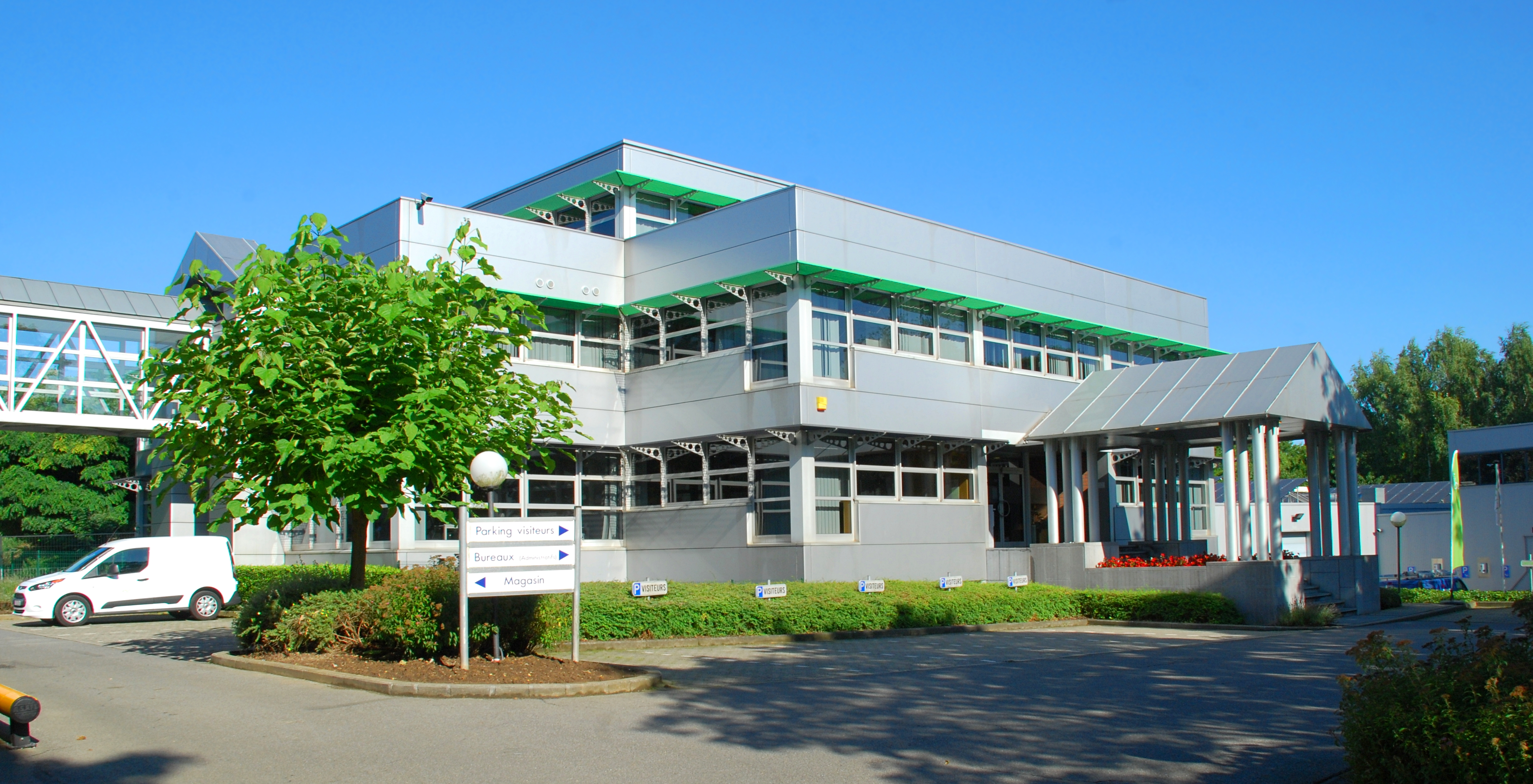
IBA headquarters, in front of the Cyclotron's East Tower.

The first director of the Cyclotron Research Centre was Yves Jongen, from Nivelles, who studied electronic engineering at the Catholic University of Louvain in the 1960s, extending his studies with a specialization in nuclear physics. In August 1970, Jongen moved to a house located near the future centre of the new town of Louvain-la-Neuve, which was still entirely under construction, which earned him the status of the first inhabitant of Louvain-la-Neuve. As the director of the Cyclotron Research Centre, Yves Jongen had the idea of reducing the size and cost of the particle accelerator, which led him to develop, in the mid-1970s, a cyclotron specially adapted for clinical use leading to the creation of Ion Beam Applications (IBA) in 1986, which settled in front of the Cyclotron's Eastern Tower. IBA became a university spin-off of UCLouvain.

== Heritage status ==
The Louvain-la-Neuve Cyclotron has received the status of Registered monument and is included in the Inventory of immovable cultural heritage of the Walloon region under reference 25121-INV-0070-01.

== Architecture ==
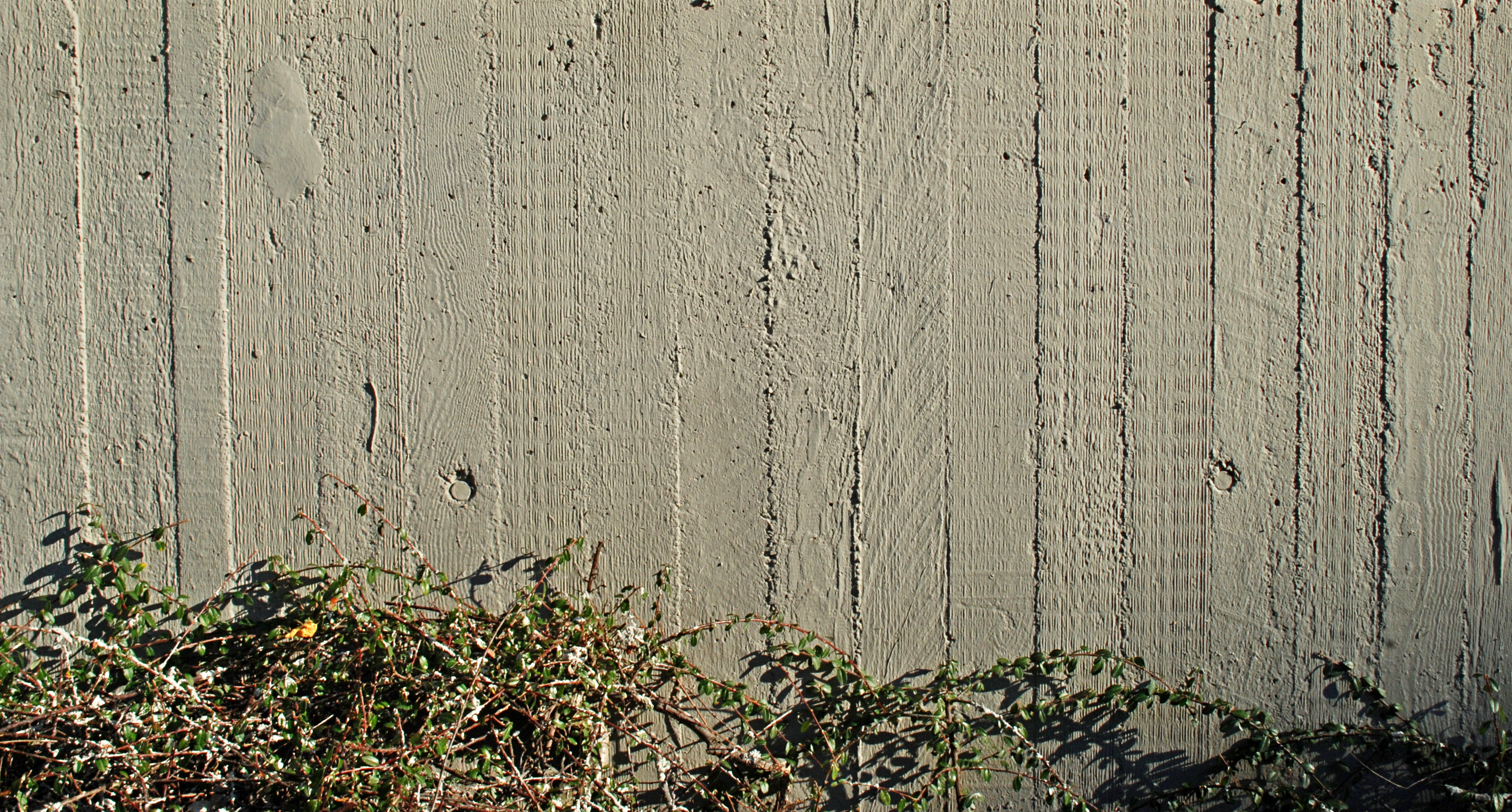
Raw concrete aspect on the North Tower.

=== Brutalism ===
While the centre of Louvain-la-Neuve is built with only a nod to brutalist tendencies, the eastern part of the town, which was first in the town's chronological development, has clearly brutalist architecture. The Cyclotron's off-centre position allowed architect Roger Bastin "to escape the Louvain-la-Neuve style where Wanlin's Walloon brick, slate roofs, snuff boxes and wooden frames dominate".

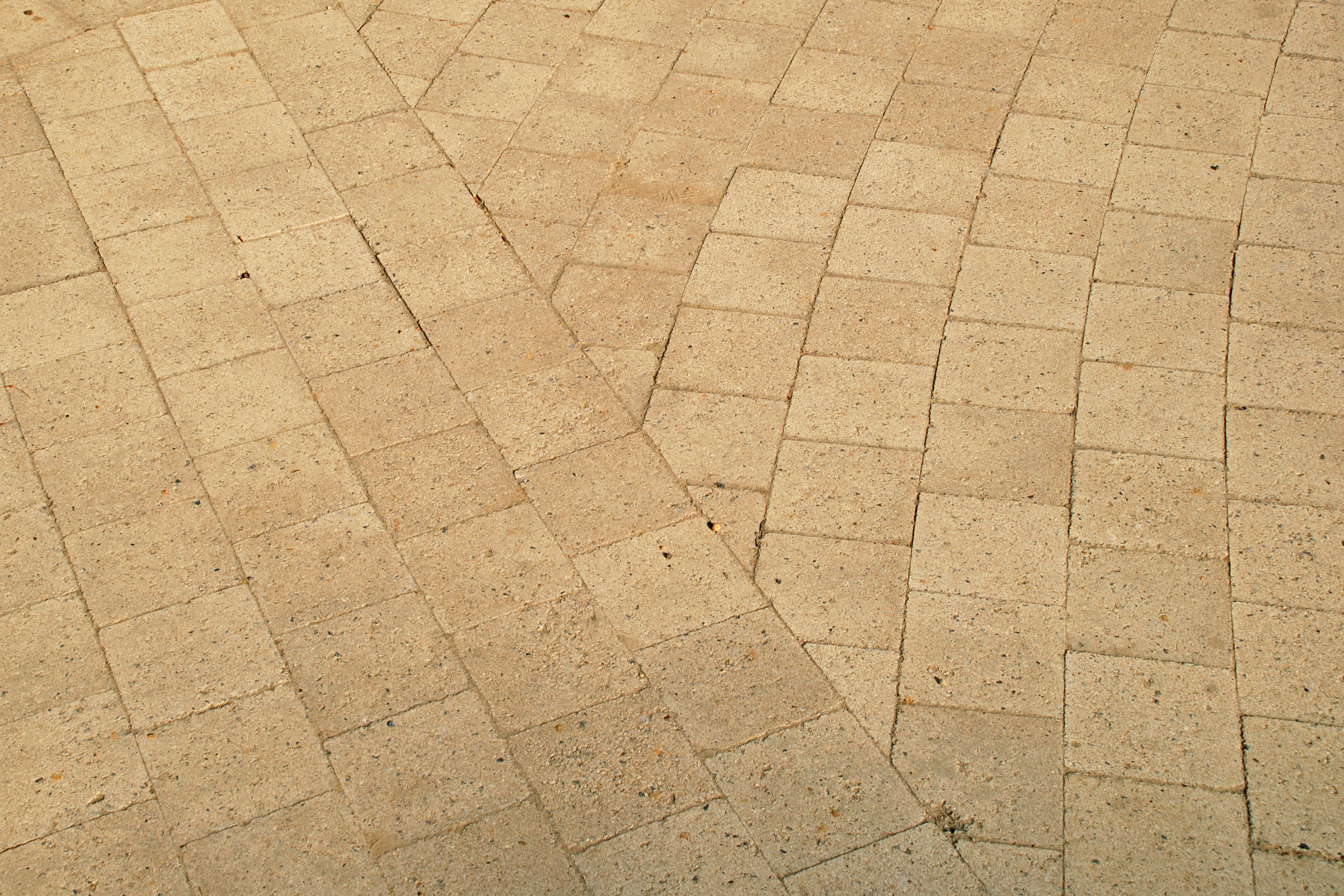
The "Blanc de Bierges" concrete pavement.

The Cyclotron's buildings are very representative of the brutalist style, characterized by facades of uncoated raw concrete, whose surfaces often have a texture inherited from formwork wood, leading to raw formwork concrete, retaining the mark of the wooden boards used for molding, their grain and their joint lines.

The pavement of the paths surrounding the Cyclotron is made of white concrete pavers known as "Blanc de Bierges", a type of paving stone found throughout Louvain-la-Neuve and that has marked its urban landscape.

=== Buildings ===
==== Structure of the complex ====
The Cyclotron's architectural complex, which develops around a central garden, consists of three office and laboratory towers (one to the west, which was the first completed, one to the north and one to the east) each 24 meters wide, and several low-rise buildings, housing auditorii up to 110 seats, several classrooms and a medical unit.

==== The Cyclotron's bunker and laboratories ====
The Cyclotron itself is a simply designed space with 3 meter thick concrete walls and an accelerator tower which is 16 meters high. The laboratories (ateliers) and technical facilities are located a bit lower than the towers.

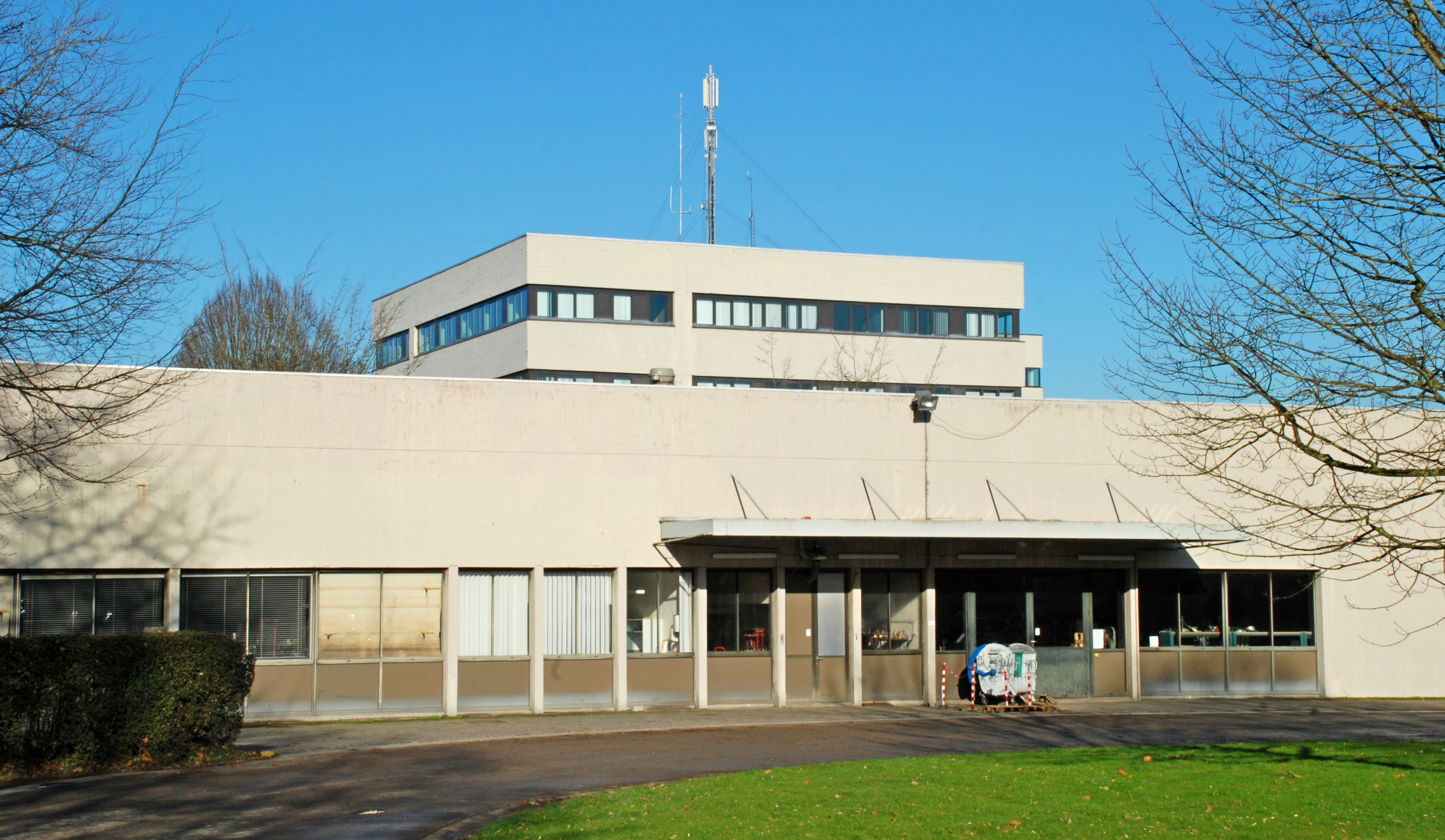
The ateliers (the Cyclotron's technical facilities).

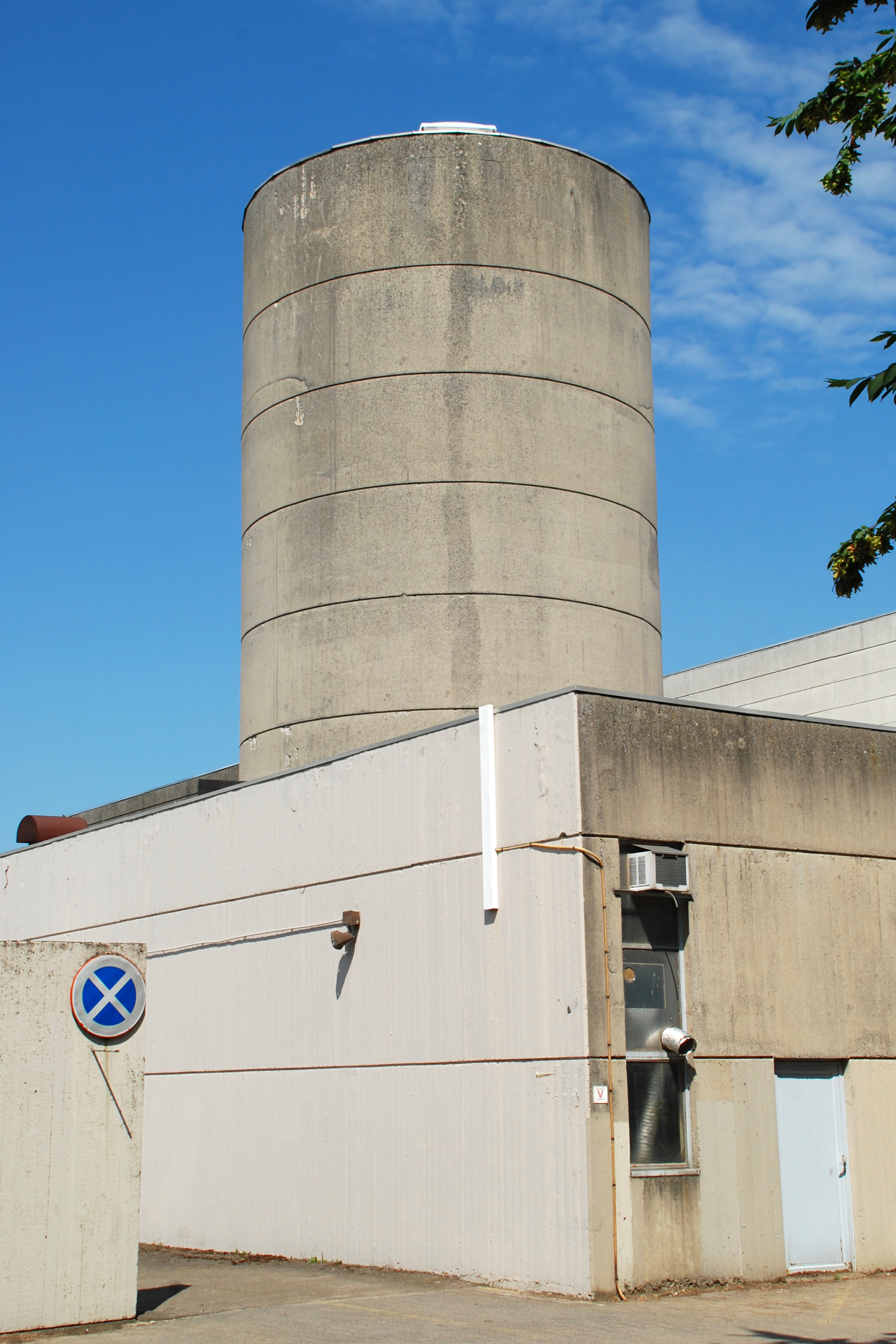
The accelerator tower.

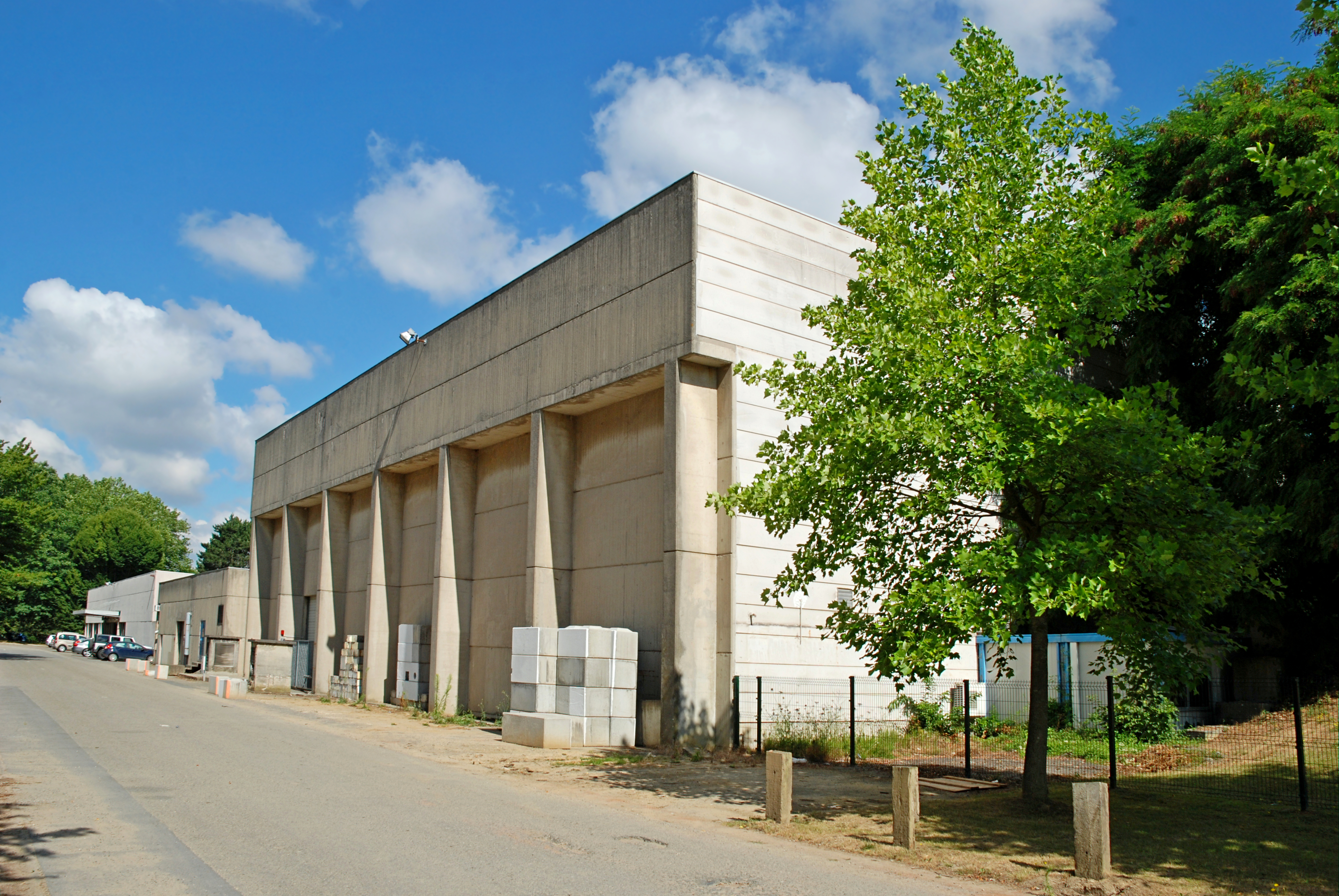
The Cyclotron's bunker with 3 meter thick walls.

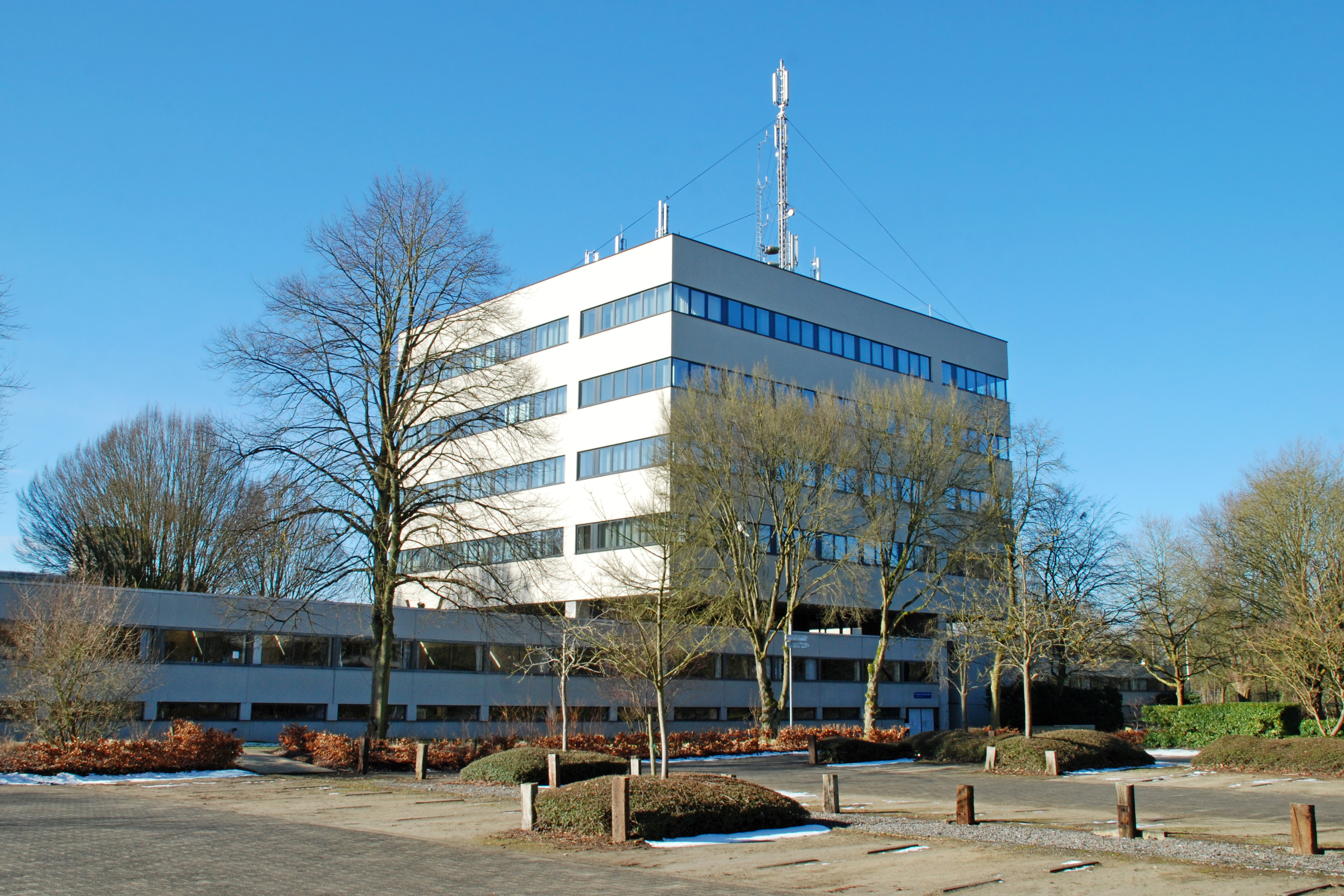
The North Tower (North-East view).

==== The North Tower (Marc de Hemptinne building) ====
The North Tower, called after Marc de Heptinne, one of the university's most famous physicists, is the highest of the three and one of Louvain-la-Neuve's largest buildings. Its five floors and adjacent wings currently house:

- the Cyclotron Resource Centre, which tests components with heavy ion, proton, neutron and Cobalt-60 beams and produces microporous membranes;
- the Louvain School of Mathematics and the School of Physics of the Faculty of Science;
- the Mathematics and Physics Research Institute;
- the Centre for Applied Molecular Technologies at the Institute for Experimental and Clinical Research;
- the Louvain Institute of Biomolecular Science and Technology;
- the Georges Lemaître Centre for Earth and Climate Research;
- ten auditorii, the largest of which (CYCL01) has 106 seats.

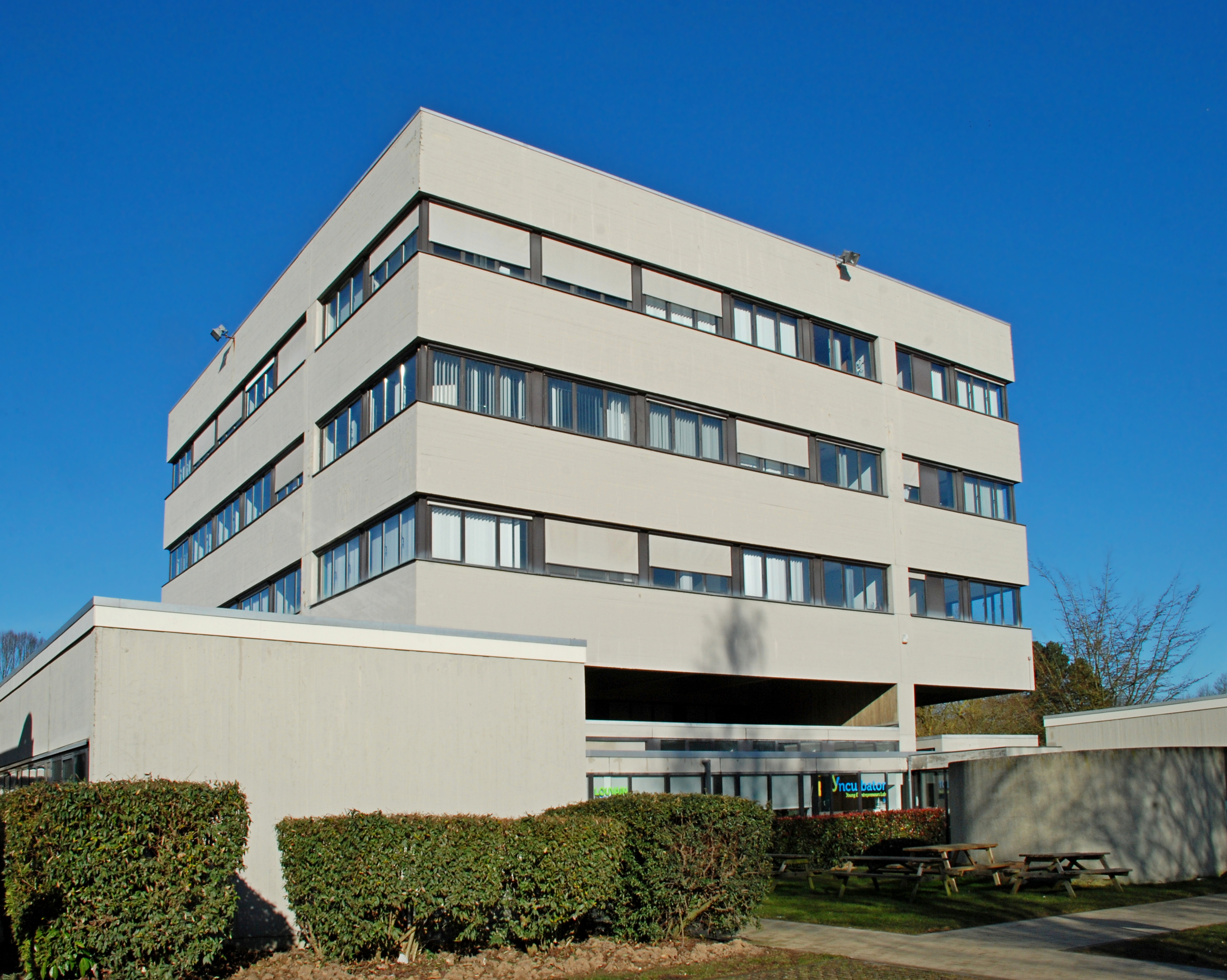
The East Tower.

==== The East Tower ====
The eastern tower, located in front of the headquarters of Ion Beam Applications, goes lower than the North Tower, with only three floors. It also houses multiple services, both in the domains of physics and of entrepreneurship & business management, projects associated with the Louvain School of Management:

- the Radiation Protection Department of the University of Louvain;
- the Business and Innovation Centre (CEI), a business incubator for startups and innovative SMEs;
- Yncubator (Young Entrepreneurs Lab), Louvain-la-Neuve's incubator for student-led projects;
- the Louvain Coworking Space.

== Public art around the Cyclotron ==
=== Science Park sculptures ===
The Louvain-la-Neuve Science Park, which stretches just behind de Cyclotron, shows a rich collection of public artworks.

==== 1970s and 1980s ====
In 1976, artist R.M. Lovell-Cooper created a stainless steel sculpture for company Afine: entitled Affinités, the sculpture stands at n° 10 rue du Bosquet and "evokes two hands raised towards the sky, the ends of which are trying to get closer".

At n° 15 on the same street stands a bronze sculpture on a rough stone base entitled L'Endormie VI, created in 1980 by the Belgian sculptor Olivier Strebelle for company Cyanamid Benelux.

At n° 4, at the corner formed with the rue du Bosquet, Hubert Minnebo's 1988 sculpture in hammered and welded copper entitled Bien motivés, ils symbolisèrent leur rayonnement.

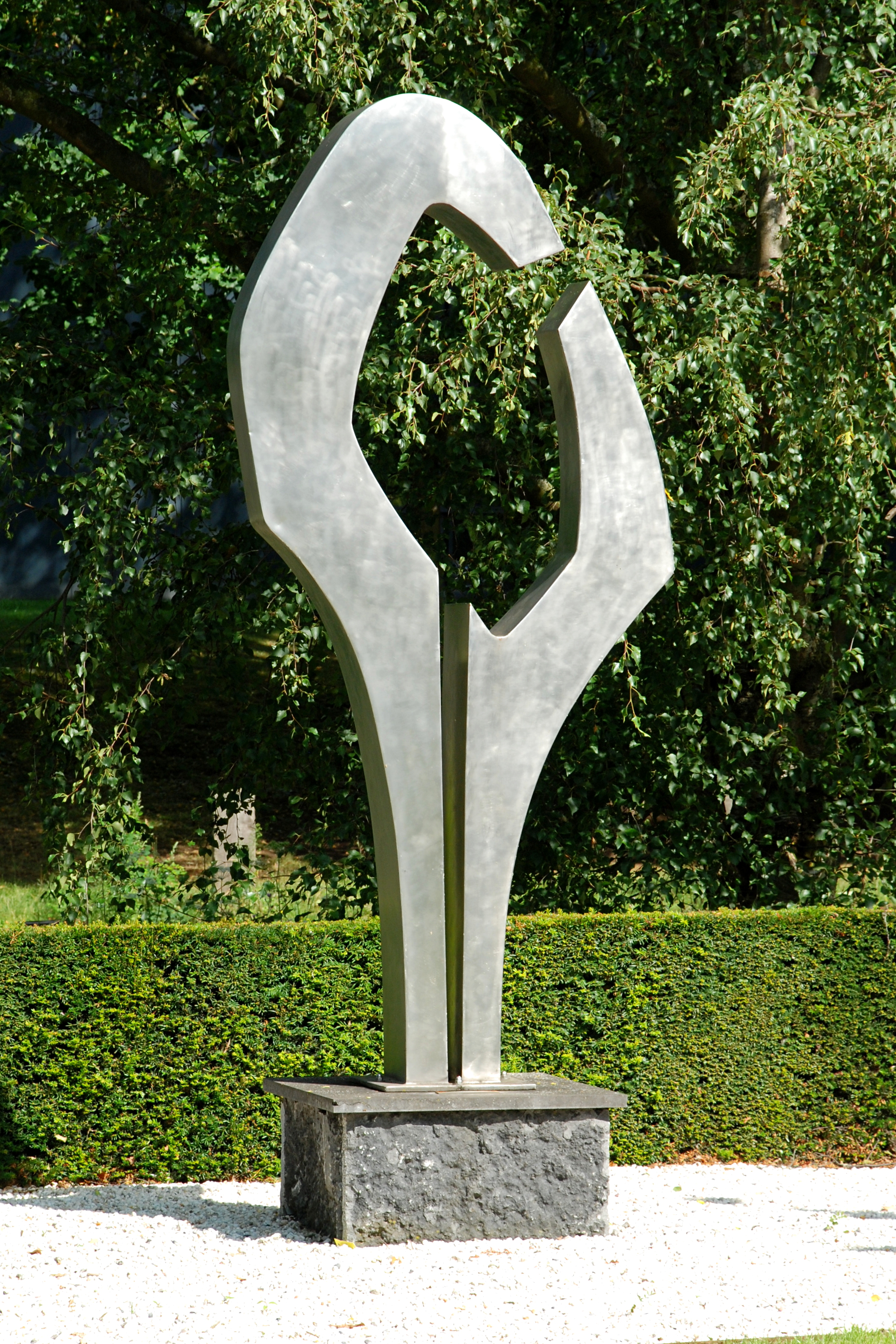
Affinités, Lovell-Cooper (1976).

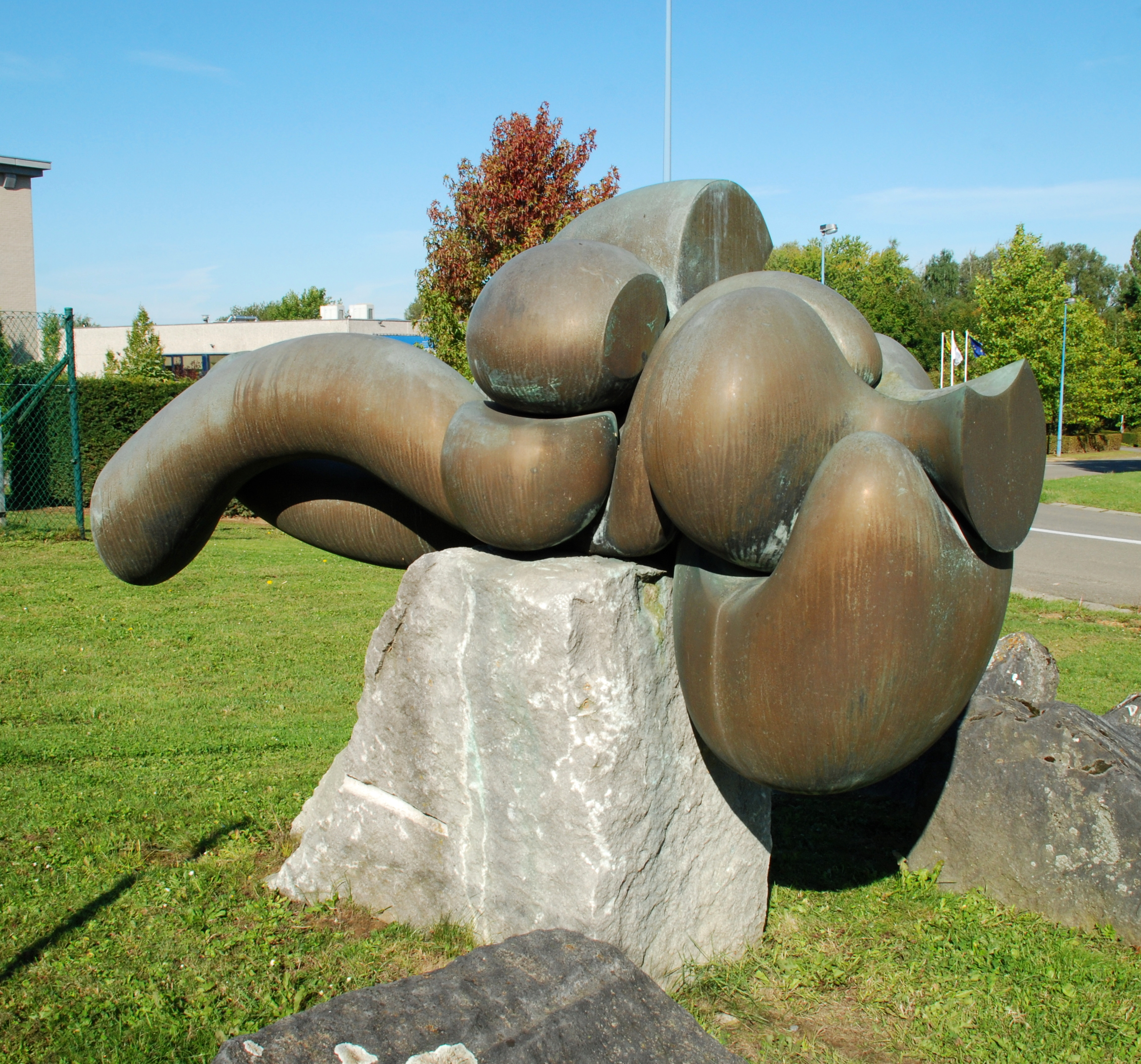
L'Endormie VI, Olivier Strebelle (1980).

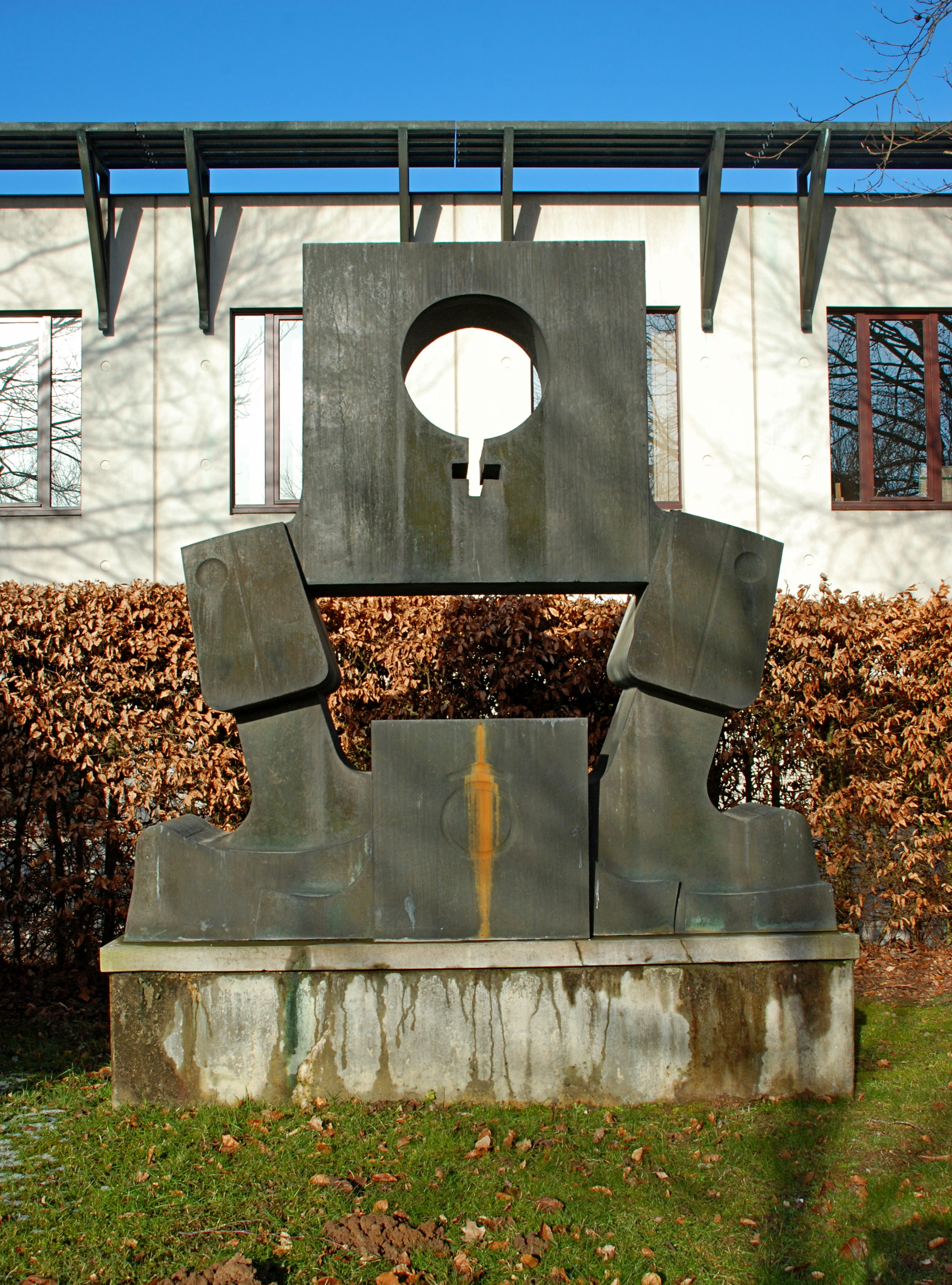
Bien motivés, ils symbolisèrent leur rayonnement, Hubert Minnebo (1988).

==== Sculptures from the 1990s ====
In front of the headquarters of Ion Beam Applications (n° 6 avenue Jean-Étienne Lenoir) inaugurated in 1991, Italian artist Mauro Staccioli erected a Corten steel sculpture of about 6 metres in diameter entitled Anneau [Ring]. For IBA, the Italian artist chose the symbolism of the circle: "With the specificity of IBA's activity, I think it is relevant to establish a link between form and content that finds, in the geometric form, the beauty of the rational and the essence of research".

Regard de Lumière, set up in 1993, is Charles Delporte's flagship artwork: "This piece is my torch, my jewel". According to critics Christophe Dosogne and Wivine de Traux, "this sculpture, created in 1948, can be found in Moscow, Paris, Namur, Brussels and Damme, in different materials and sizes". Here in Louvain-la-Neuve, where it stands at n° 4 Albert Einstein Avenue, it is made of bronze skated on a polyester base and "represents the trinity of the theological virtues: faith, hope and charity".

In 1998, Marie-Paule Haar installed an untitled sculpture at n° 1 Albert Einstein Avenue, consisting of a 5 meter high powder-coated aluminum structure. Standing on the parking lot of the Louvain-la-Neuve driving test centre, the sculpture refers to a motorway interchange loop.

In front of n° 15 Albert Einstein Avenue stands a 2 meter high bronze sculpture on blue stone entitled Le Porteur d'eau, created by Thérèse Chotteau in 1999 for Realco. "The man placed in balance on the inclined space of the support carries on his shoulder a bronze wavy line representing water. Thérèse Chotteau's water carrier echoes Realco's activity, which produces enzymes and bacteria for water purification."

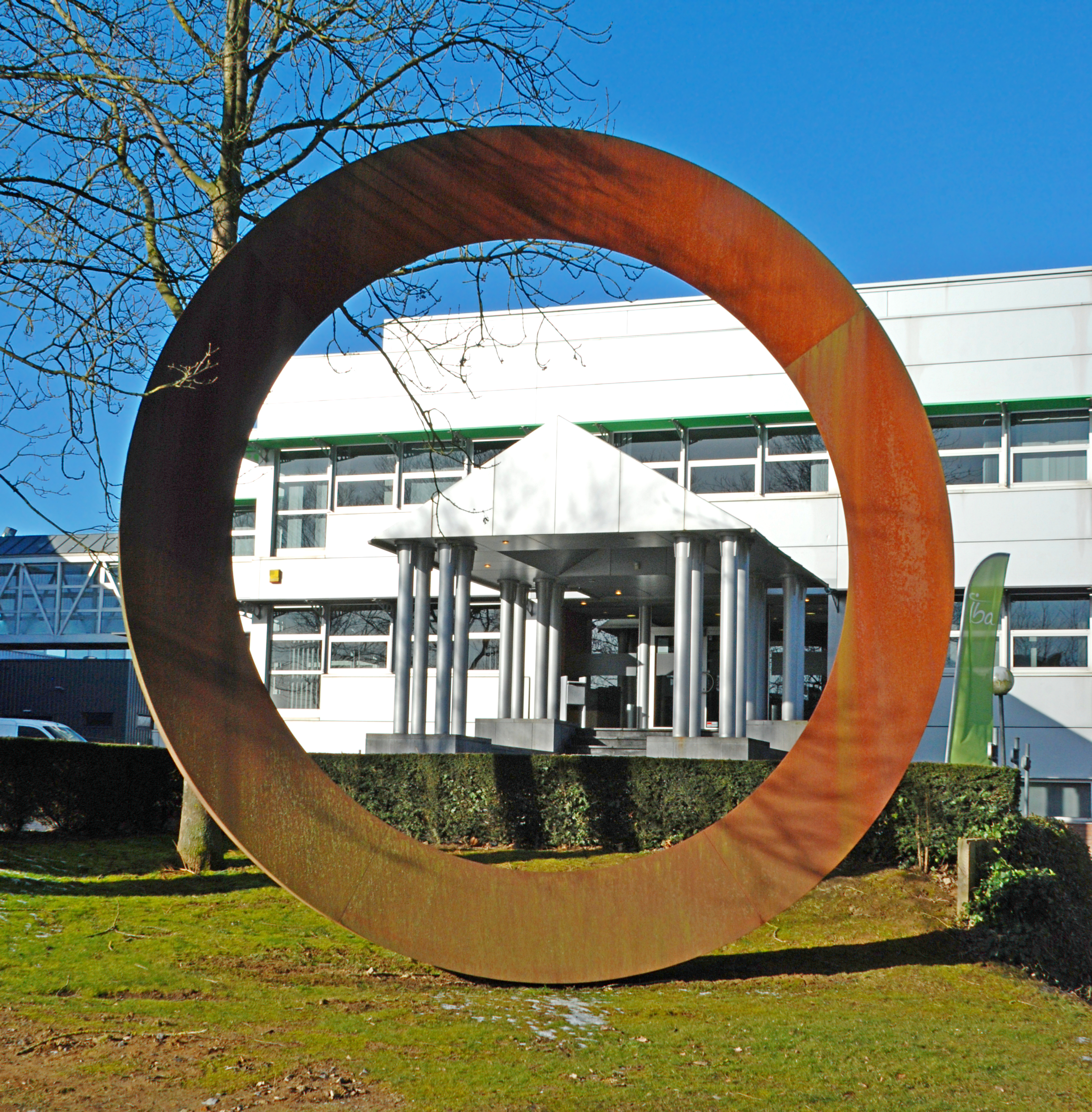
Anneau, Mauro Staccioli (1960s).

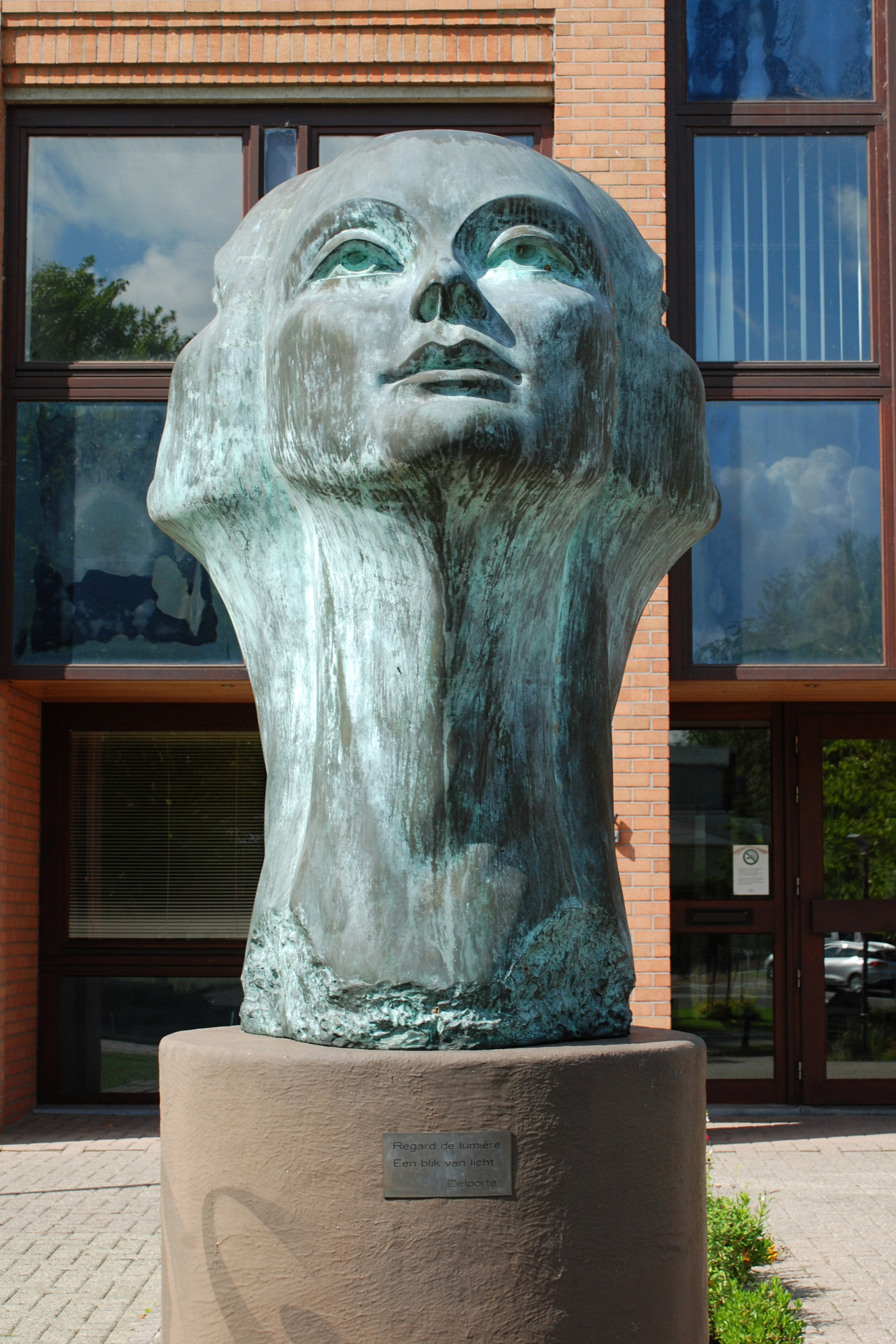
Regard de Lumière, Charles Delporte (1993).

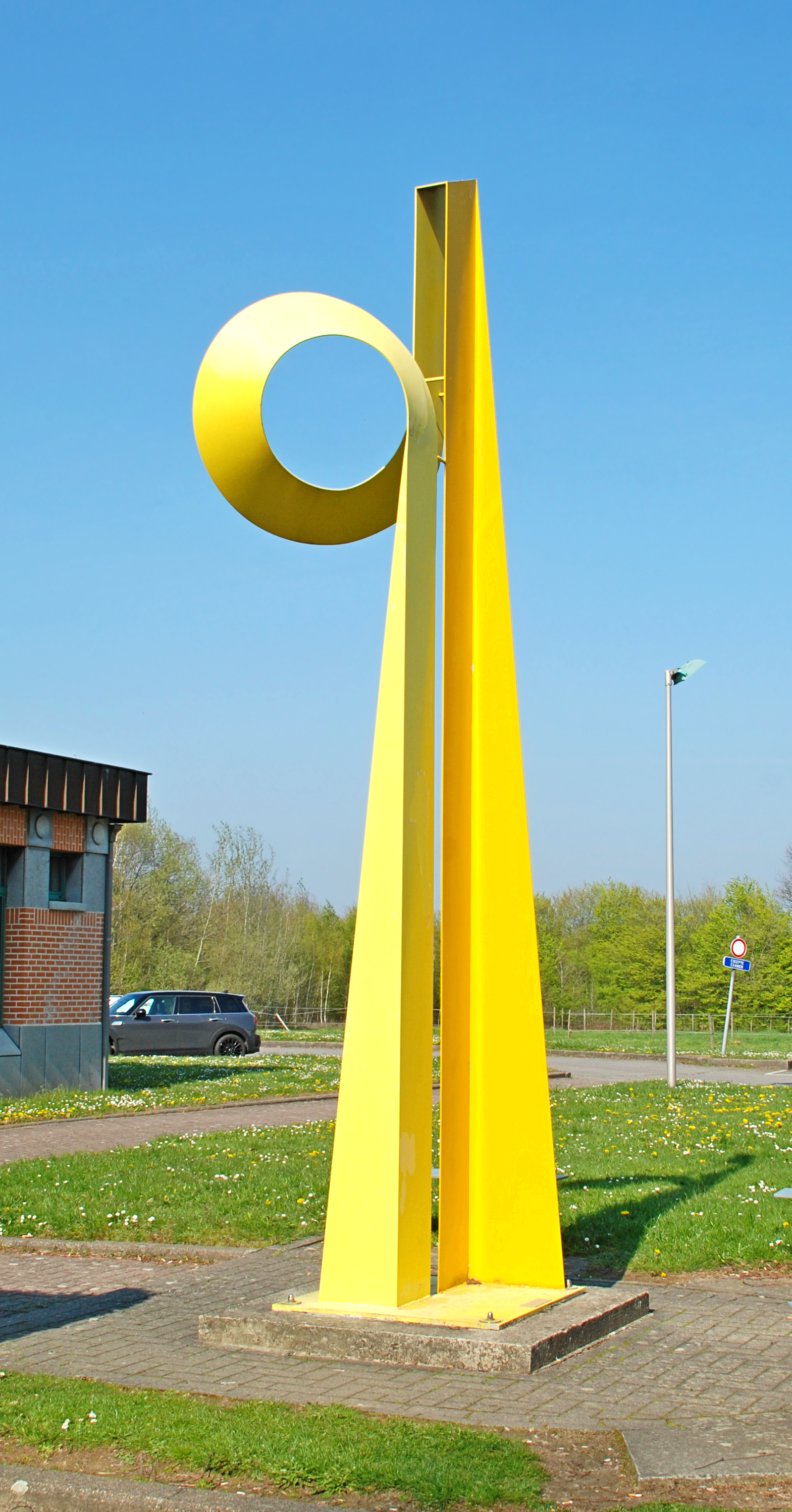
Untitled, Marie-Paule Haar (1998).

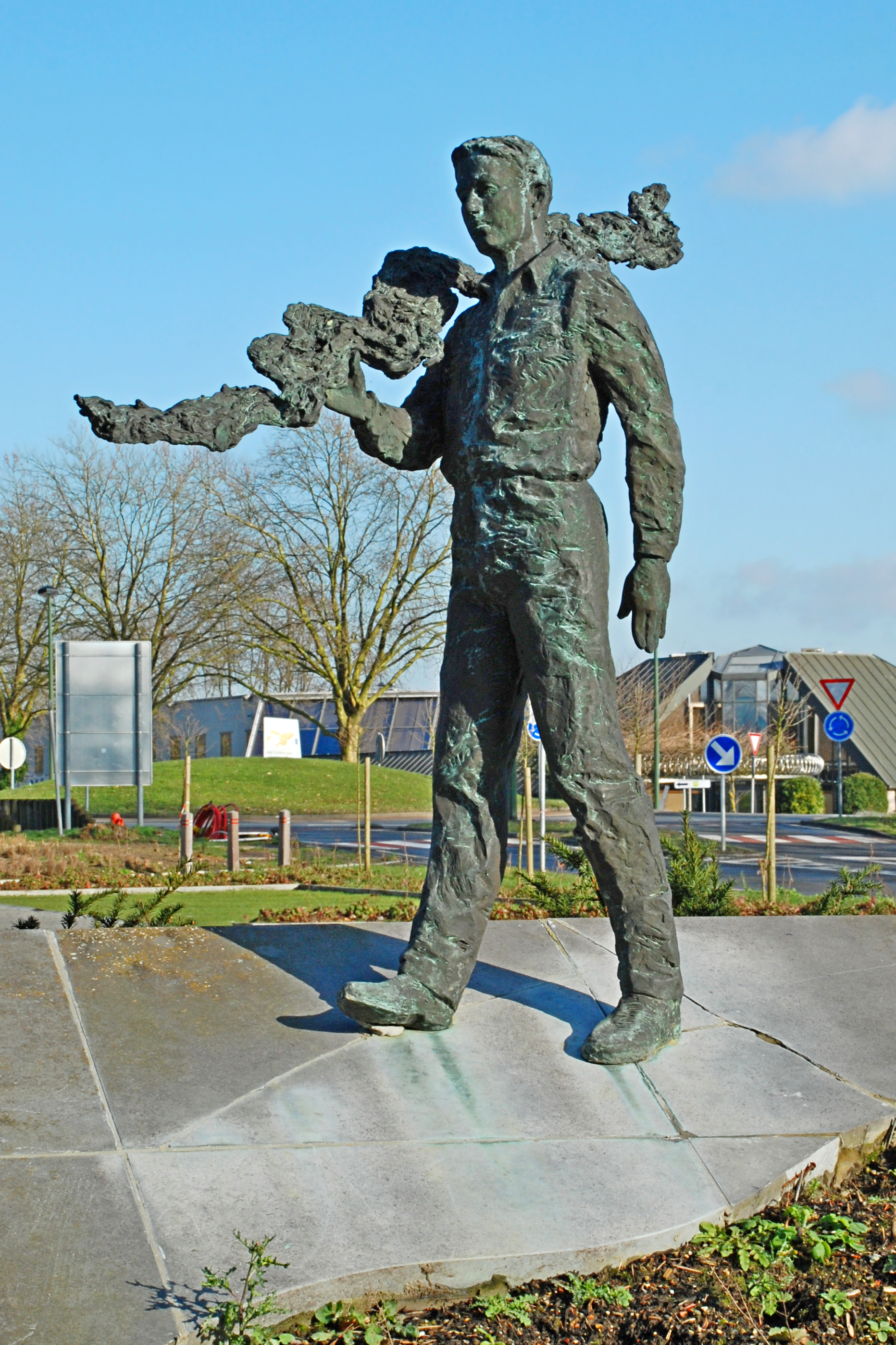
Le Porteur d'eau, Thérèse Chotteau (1999).

==== Sculptures from the 2000s ====
At the corner of avenue Albert Einstein and avenue Jean-Étienne Lenoir, at the foot of the postmodern New Tech Center building (DSW Architects, 1999), Vinciane Renard created the artwork Valentin, a bronze sculpture, in 2000.

At n° 1 rue du Bosquet, also in the year 2000, artist Roxane Enescu erected Lapte, a titanium sculpture promoted by company Fasska. According to the artist, "This open, ascending and evolving circle is a metallic surface element made of titanium sheet that wraps itself around a space inhabited by human beings (...). This essential curve suggests the pregnant woman's stomach, the cradle, softness, well-being". Many stylized figures have been carved from metal.

Patience is a sculpture in black Denée marble and crinoid limestone created in 2005 by Romanian-born artist Marian Sava for company Immosc (located at n° 7 rue du Bosquet).

La Découverte [The Discovery], made in 2005 by Luc Vanhonnacker at n° 13, avenue Albert Einstein, reveals fragments of the human body gushing out of the blue stone.

In search of the lost star or Scrutateur d'étoiles, created in 2006 by Philip Aguirre y Otegui for Interscience at n° 2 avenue Jean-Étienne Lenoir is a 3 meter high concrete sculpture.

At the corner of the avenue Albert Einstein and rue Louis De Geer, Geneviève Vastrade erected a kind of totem pole made of an old stone agricultural roller. This scroll engraved with letters, some of which are carved upside down evokes both the agricultural land on which Louvain-la-Neuve is built and the scrolls of the presses used in printing plants, such as the Denef printer and publisher in front of which the sculpture stands.

With his steel sheet sculpture L'Alu Blister, created in 2007 at n° 5 rue du Bosquet, Vincent Strebell chose to refer to the activity of sponsoring firm Constantia, specialized in printing aluminium foils for the pharmaceutical industry.

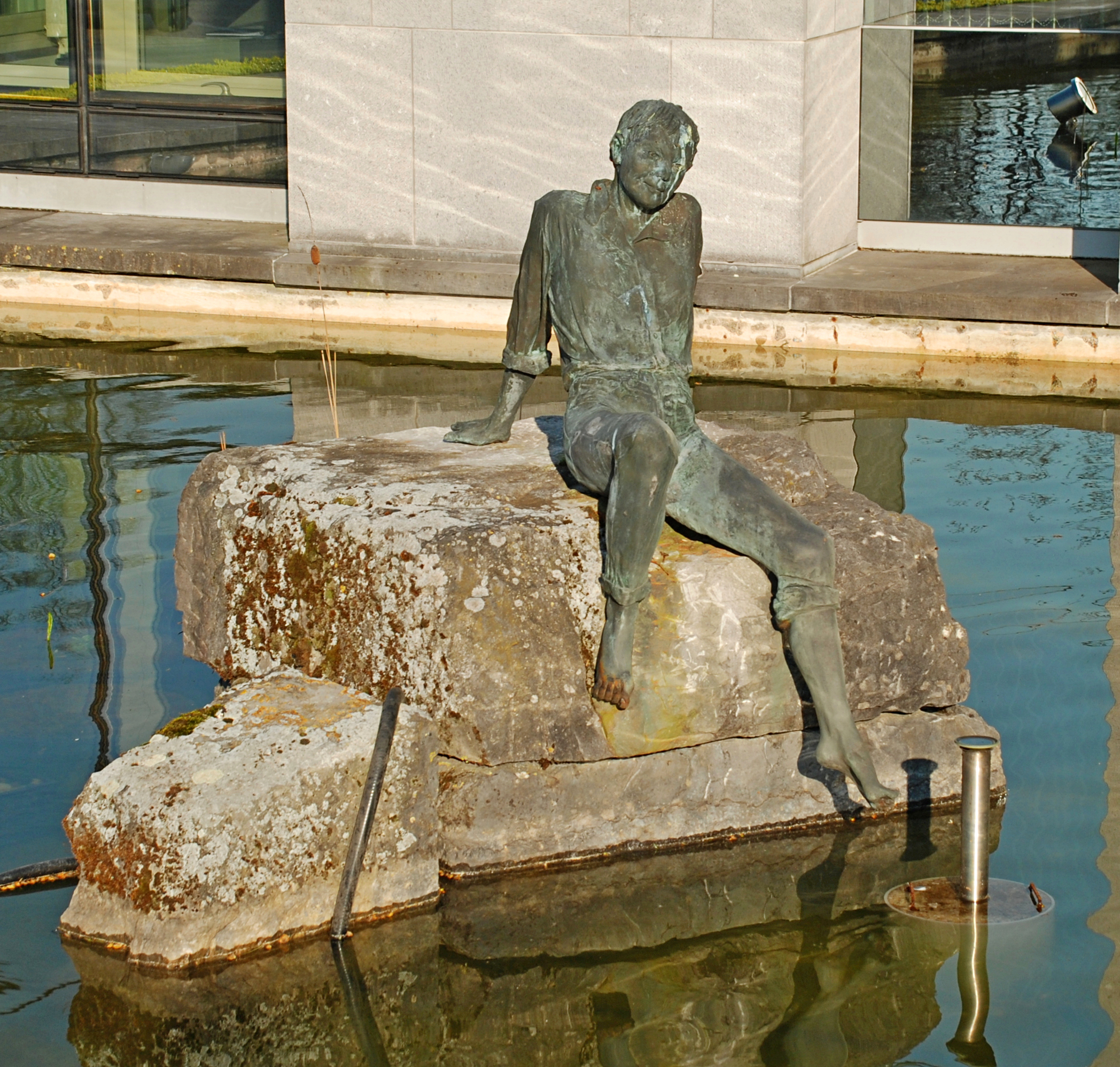
Valentin, Vinciane Renard (2000).

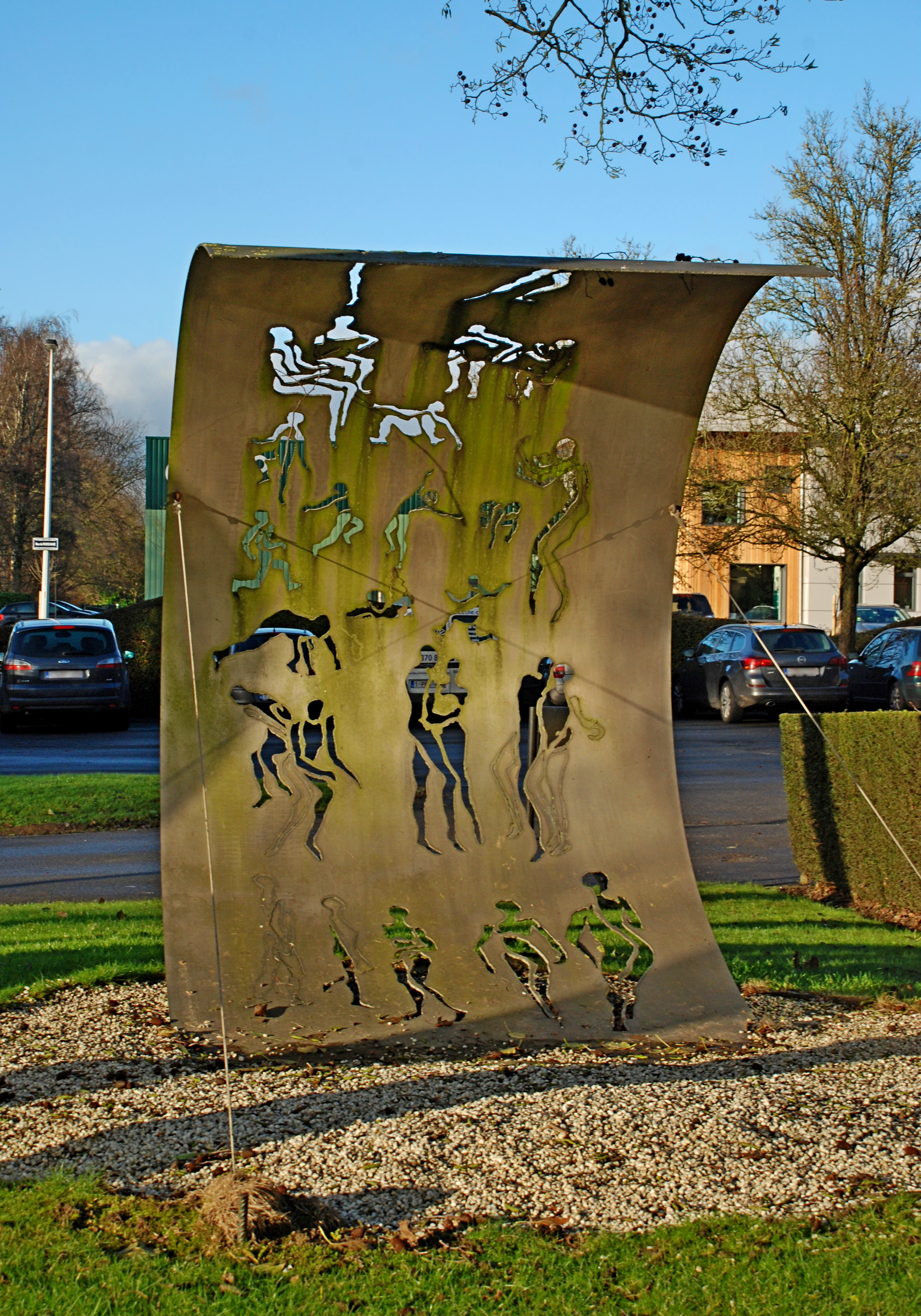
Lapte, Roxane Enescu (2000).

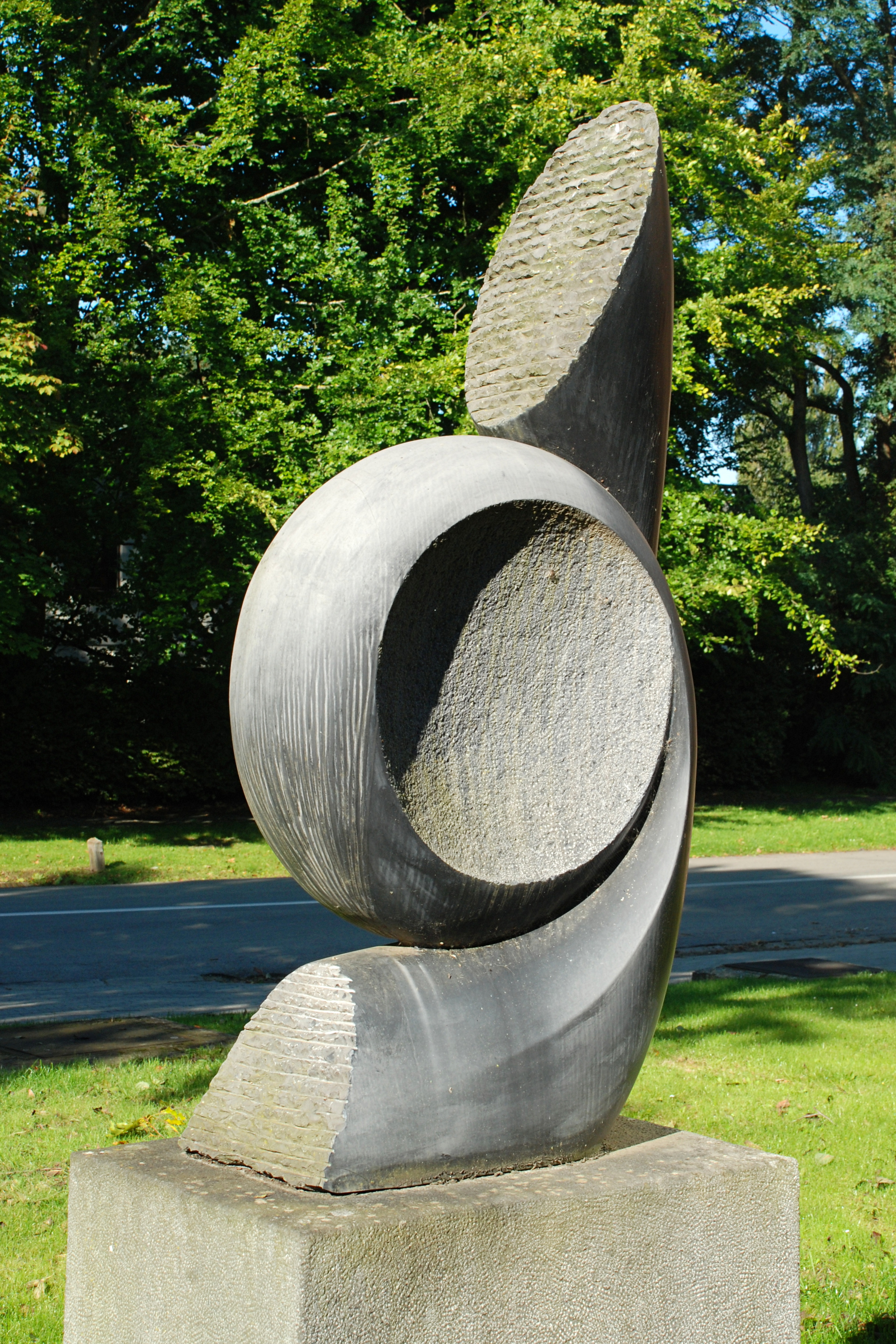
Patience, Marian Sava (2005).

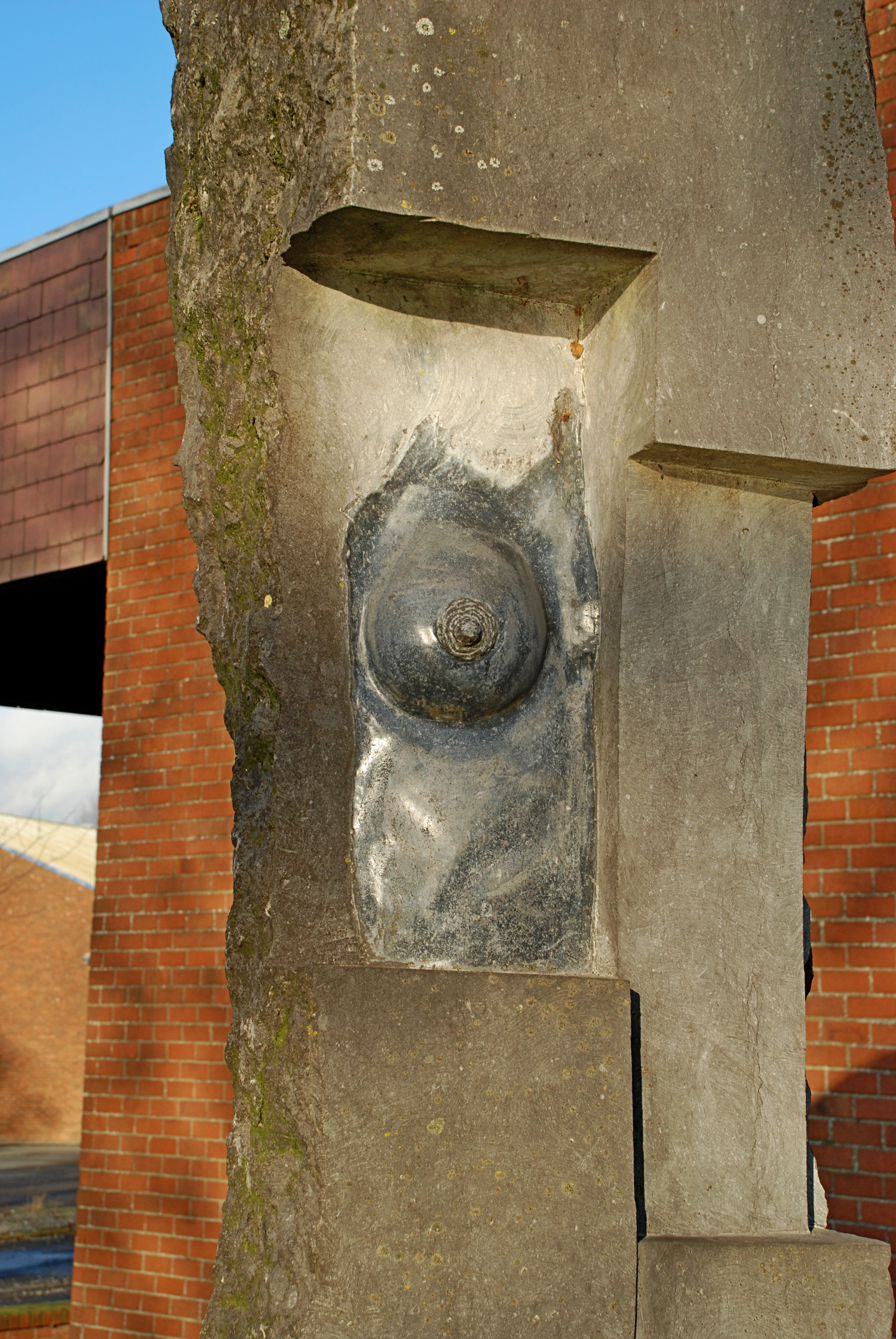
La Découverte, Luc Vanhonnacker (2005).

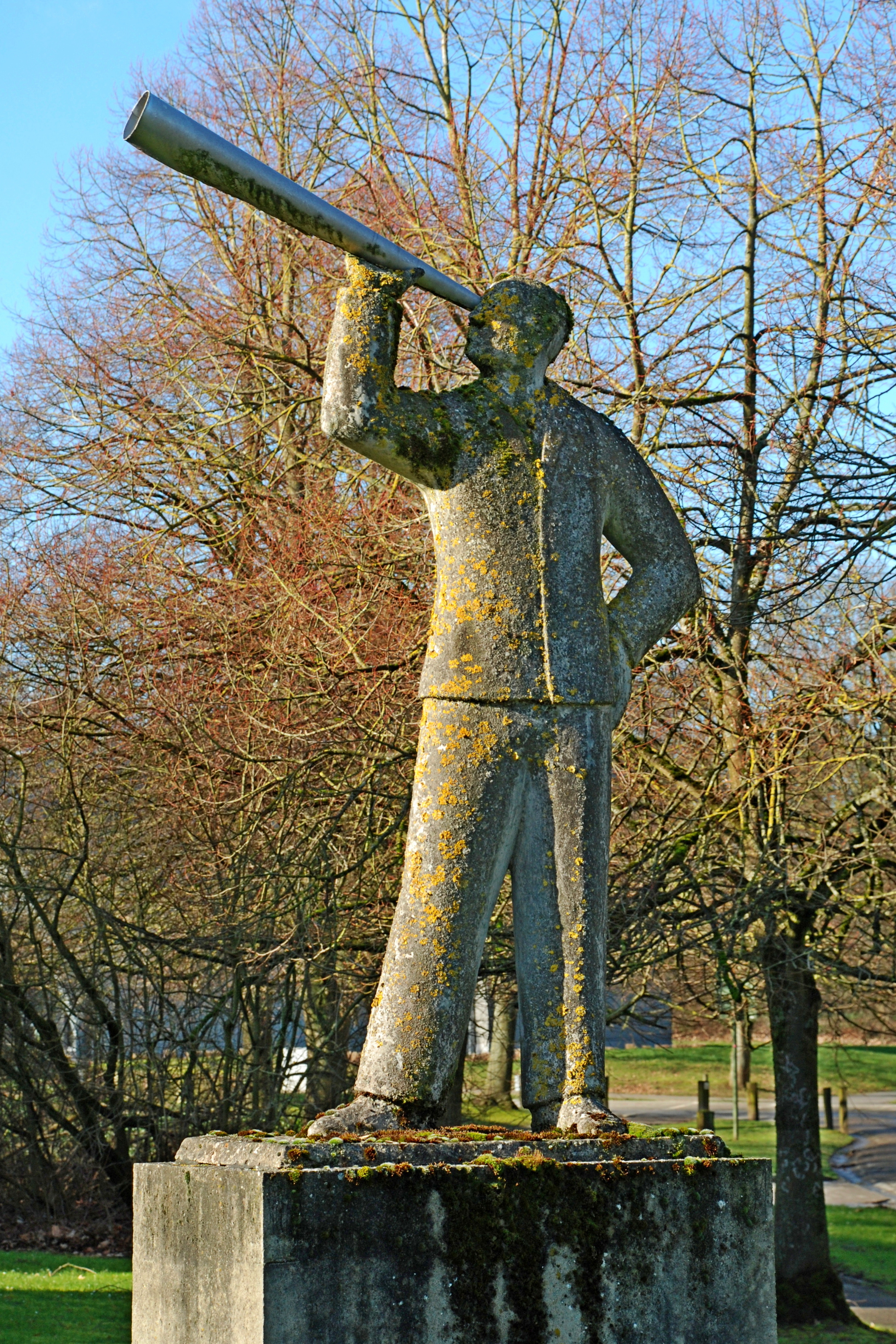
À la recherche de l'étoile perdue, Philip Aguirre (2006).

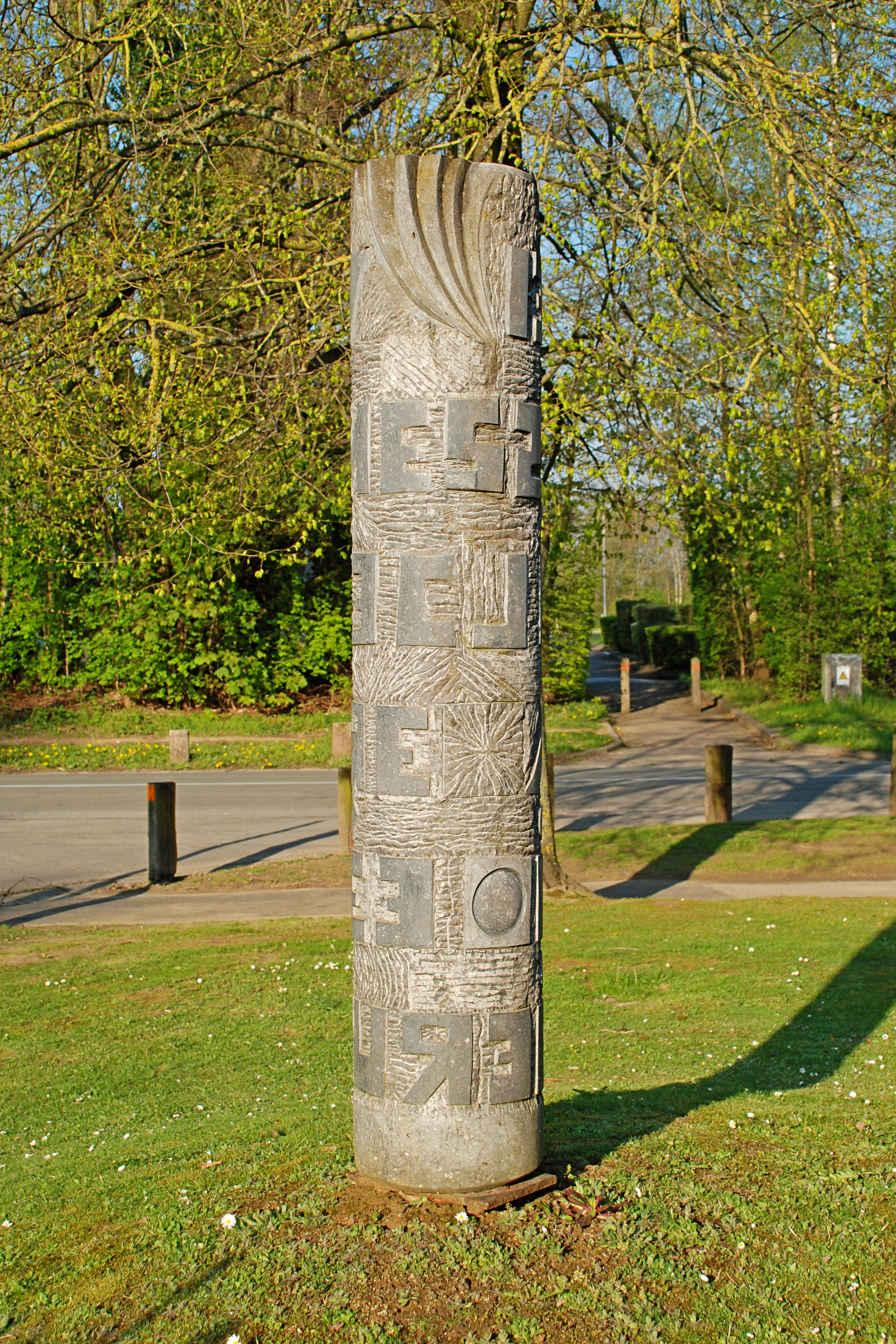
Untitled, Geneviève Vastrade (2006).

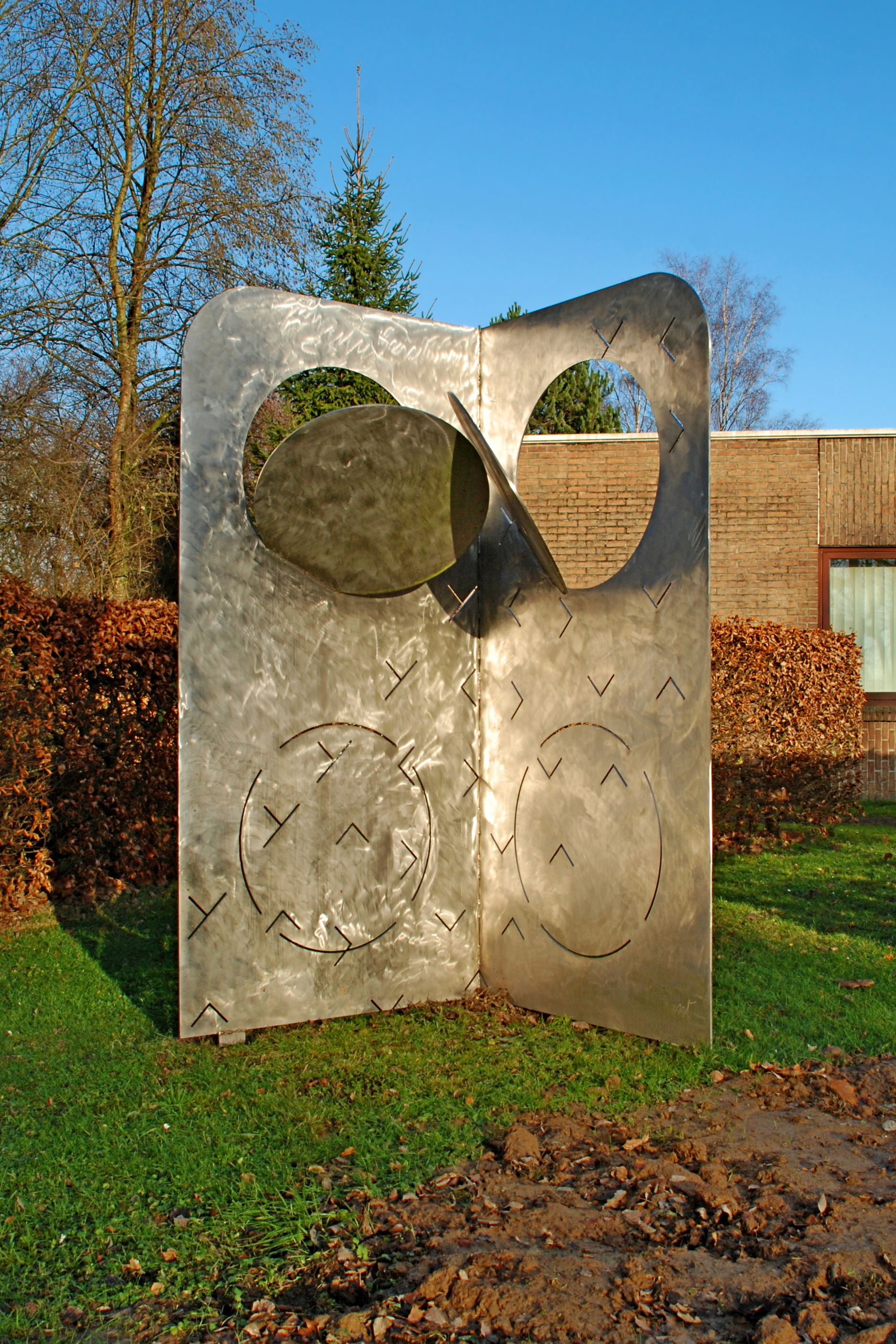
Alu Blister, Vincent Strebell (2007).
