= Museum voor Schone Kunsten =

Museum voor Schone Kunsten may refer to:

- Museum of Fine Arts, Ghent (Museum voor Schone Kunsten Gent)
- Museum of Fine Arts, Ostend (Museum voor Schone Kunsten Oostende)
- Royal Museum of Fine Arts, Antwerp (Koninklijk Museum voor Schone Kunsten Antwerpen)
- Royal Museums of Fine Arts of Belgium (Koninklijke Musea voor Schone Kunsten van België)
