= Ion Beam Applications =

Belgian medical technology company

IBA (Ion Beam Applications)
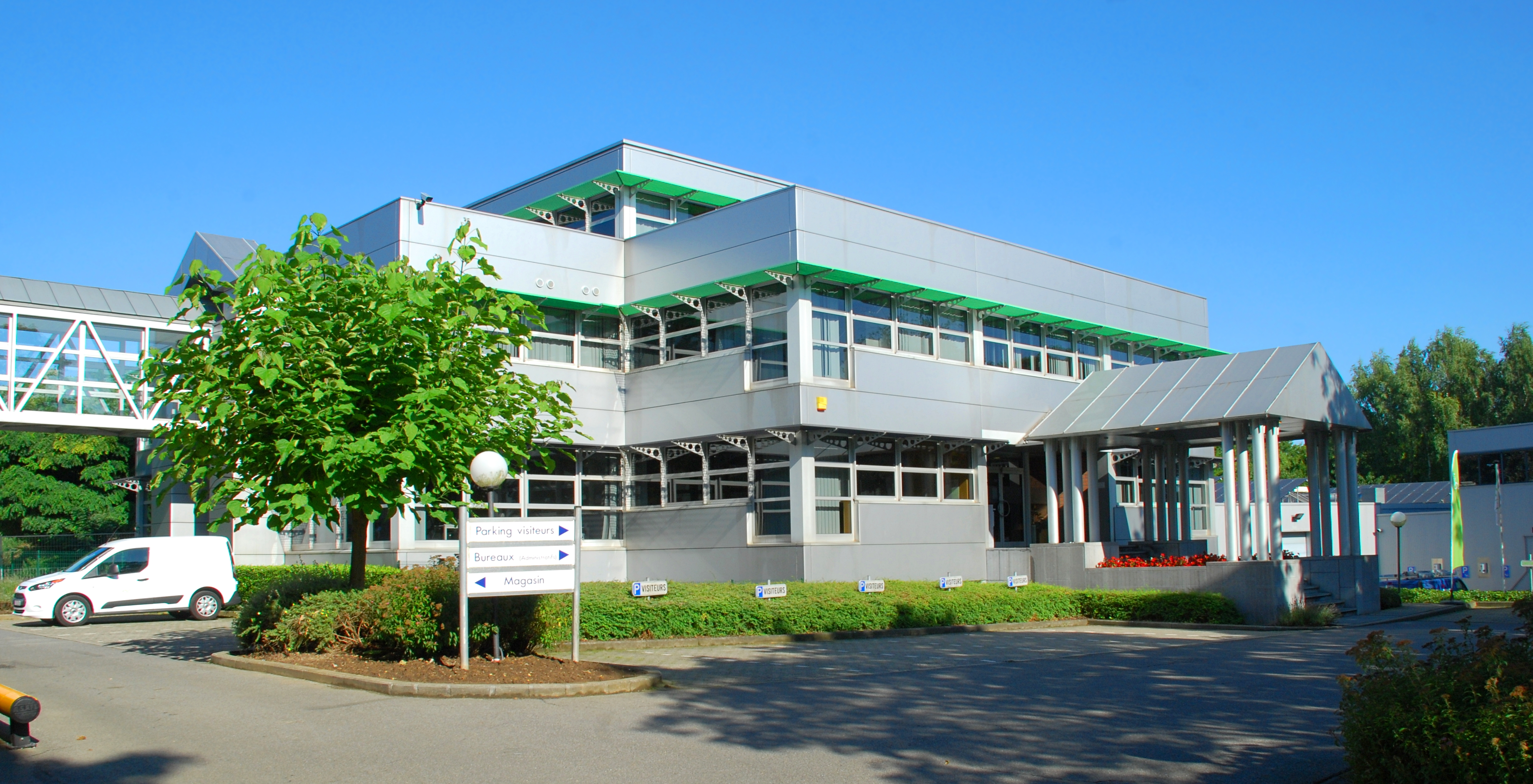
- Headquarters of Ion Beam Applications (IBA) in Louvain-la-Neuve
- Type: Public
- Traded as: Euronext Brussels: IBAB
- Industry: Medical technology
- Founded: 1986; 40 years ago
- Founder: Yves Jongen
- Headquarters: Louvain-la-Neuve, Belgium
- Area served: Worldwide
- Key people: Olivier Legrain (CEO)
- Website: iba-worldwide.com

IBA (Ion Beam Applications SA) is a medical technology company based in Louvain-la-Neuve. The company was founded in 1986 by Yves Jongen within the Cyclotron Research Center of the University of Louvain (UCLouvain) and became a university spin-off. It employs about 1500 people in 40 locations. The company developed cyclotrons and integrated proton therapy centers is active in the field of proton therapy, dosimetry, radiopharmacy solutions and industrial sterilisation.

IBA installed its first proton therapy equipment for Boston's Massachusetts General Hospital in 2001, and for University of Pennsylvania's Proton Center in 2009.

It supplied equipment and services to Proton Partners International which was developing three proton beam therapy centers in the United Kingdom.

In 2017, IBA invested €16 million in the construction of a new logistics and production center in Louvain-la-Neuve.
