= Rutherford Health =

British private healthcare provider

Rutherford Health was a private oncology provider founded by Mike Moran and Karol Sikora in 2015, with investment from Neil Woodford and the Wales Life Sciences Investment Fund, to develop proton therapy facilities in the United Kingdom and elsewhere. Until 2019 it was known as Proton Partners International.

It went into liquidation in June 2022. According to major shareholder Schroders UK Public Private Trust, the company had pursued a "flawed expansion strategy ... from 2015 to 2019" leading to "a high and unsustainable cash burn". However, it has since been established that both Schroders and Link, who took over the Woodford portfolios of WPCT and WEIF, ran interference in the Company's ability to raise capital by blocking the Authorities at the 2021 AGM.

== Proton therapy ==
Rutherford Health ran proton therapy centres in Newport, Wales, Bedlington, Northumberland, Liverpool and Reading, Berkshire. Equipment and services were provided by Ion Beam Applications, Philips and Elekta. The Newport site was the first to open with construction starting in 2016. The Reading site cost £30 million and work began in December 2016, before opening in October 2018. The Bedlington site was opened in 2018.

Funding included £10 million from the Wales Life Sciences Investmunt Fund in 2016, as well as continued investment of over £100 million through fund manager Neil Woodford. The Wales Audit Office criticised handling of the Wales Life Sciences Investment Fund due to Woodford being the company's main shareholder. Proton Partners secured £30 million from Shawbrook Bank in January 2016 which it later repaid in full in 2019. The Northumberland site benefited from a grant of £450,000 from the Let’s Grow regional growth fund programme.

In November 2016 Proton Partners purchased the Gulf International Cancer Centre in Abu Dhabi as part of plans to create the first proton beam therapy treatment centre in the United Arab Emirates. Work began in 2019.

In March 2017, the company announced the development of its fourth UK centre to be built by Interserve on the Knowledge Quarter site in Liverpool The centre was completed in 2020 and is now fully operational. In 2018 it was announced that work had started on a headquarters for their Rutherford Diagnostics subsidiary. The building was to serve as a research centre, sited next to their Liverpool cancer treatment centre.

== Other activities ==
Proton Partners International incorporated five companies in total, including Rutherford Estates, Rutherford Innovations and Rutherford Diagnostics. In July 2020, the Company launched a membership scheme, "Rutherford Direct" aimed at providing a "cancer only plan" to companies and individuals as an insurance in case of a cancer diagnosis.

In June 2020, Rutherford Health partnered with Panthera Biopartners to set up a network of clinical trial sites. Under the name "Panthera@theRutherford", clinical oncology trials were to be undertaken at Rutherford sites, utilising Panthera's "clinical trial management experience".

In September 2021 Michael Richards opened the first community diagnostic centre in England, on the outskirts of Taunton, to be operated by Rutherford Health in partnership with Somerset NHS Foundation Trust. The trust was to pay a "tariff price" for the service and was reimbursed for the use of its staff.

== See also ==
- Private healthcare in the United Kingdom
