= Charles Delporte (artist) =

Belgian artist (1928–2012)

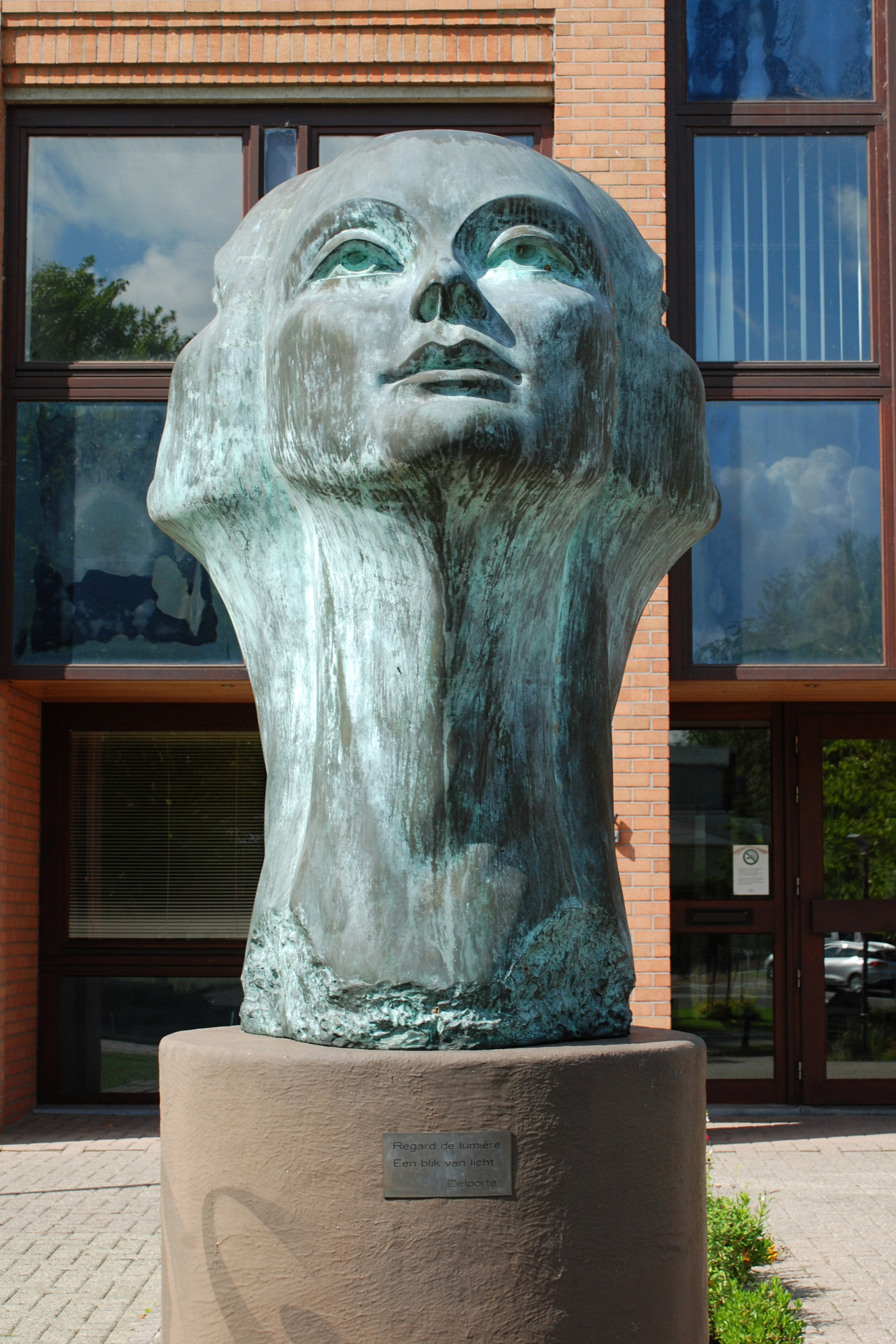
- Regard de Lumière, Louvain-la-Neuve, Belgium
- Born: Charles Delporte; 4 December 1928; Marcinelle, Belgium
- Died: 6 November 2012 (aged 83); Charleroi, Belgium
- Occupation: Painter

Charles Delporte (4 December 1928 – 6 November 2012) was a Belgian painter and sculptor.

Delporte was born in Marcinelle. There are four tendencies in his work: realistic, genetic, geophysical and nuclear. Over 300 of his visual works are exhibited in museums, foundations, churches and cities worldwide, e.g. in the Royal Museums of Fine Arts of Belgium, the Royal Palace of Brussels, the Élysée Palace and the National Library in Paris, the Museum of Contemporary Art Tokyo, the São Paulo Museum of Modern Art, the Museum of Fine Arts in Montevideo, the Belgian embassy in Beijing, the University of Houston.

In addition, Delporte was also known as a poet and singer, and these aspects of his work were often combined with his paintings or sculptures.

He was appointed Knight in the Pontifical Equestrian Order of St. Sylvester Pope and Martyr by Pope John Paul II.

Delporte died, aged 83, in Charleroi. A museum was dedicated to him in the city of Damme, near Bruges, from 1990 until 2013.
