= Marc de Hemptinne =

Belgian physicist

Marc de Hemptinne (Ghent, 1902–1986) was a Belgian physicist. He was the son of Alexandre de Hemptinne, a professor at the University of Leuven. He studied chemistry at the University of Ghent and obtained a PhD in Science in 1926. Marc de Hemptinne was a pioneer of molecular spectroscopy. In 1948 he was awarded the Francqui Prize on Exact Sciences.
