= Philip Aguirre y Otegui =

Belgian artist (born 1961)

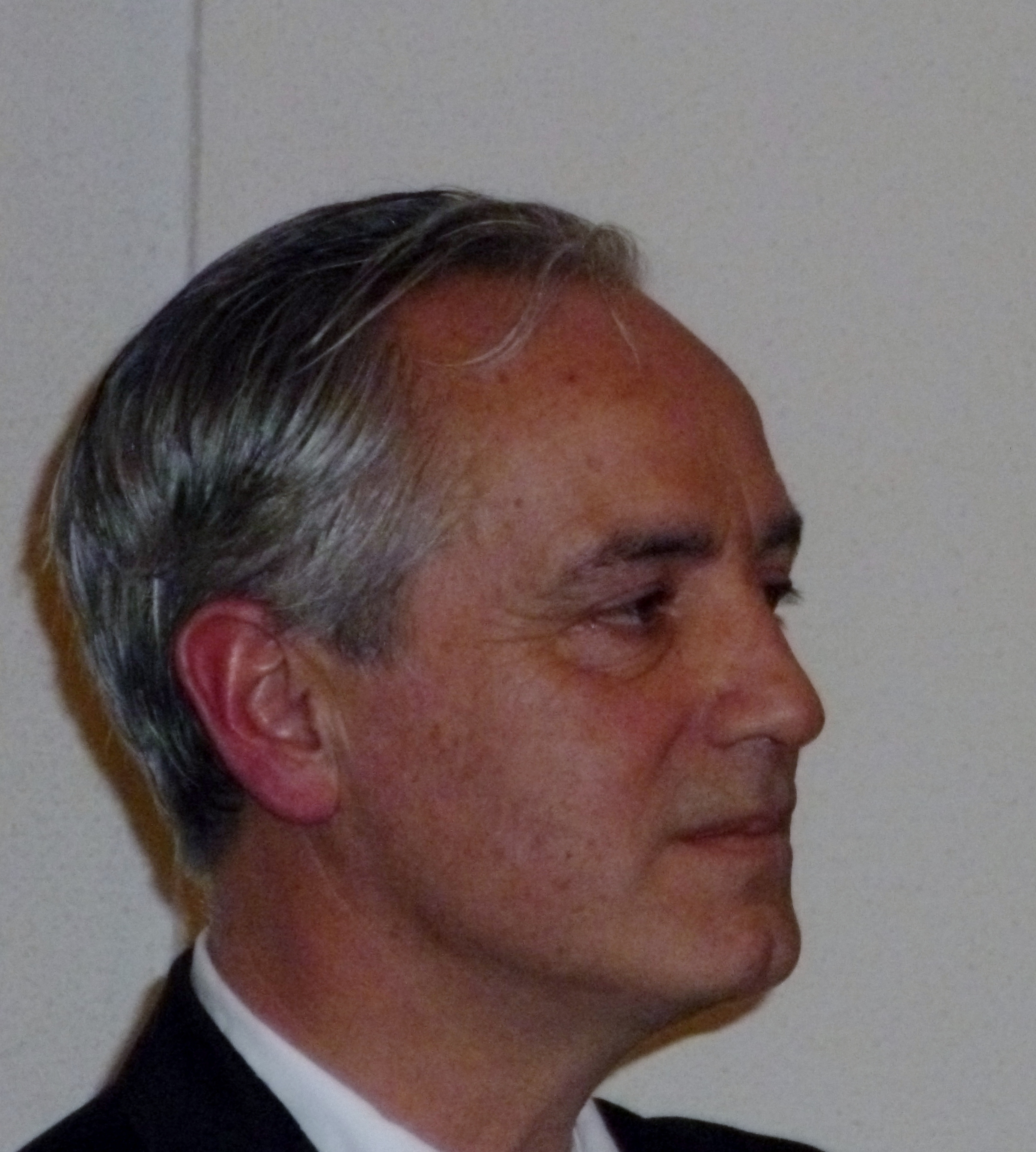
Philip Aguirre y Otegui in 2013

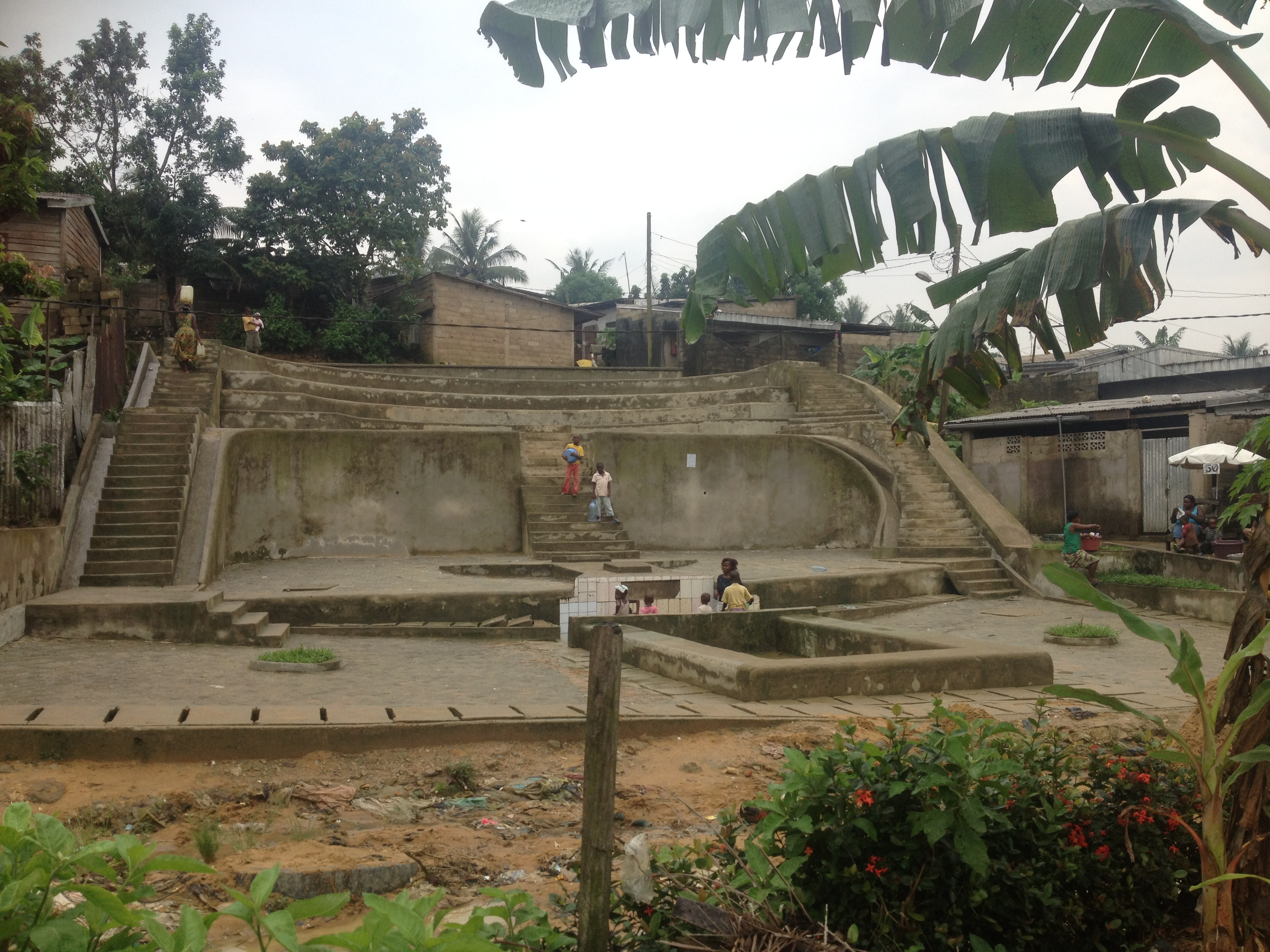
Théatre Source

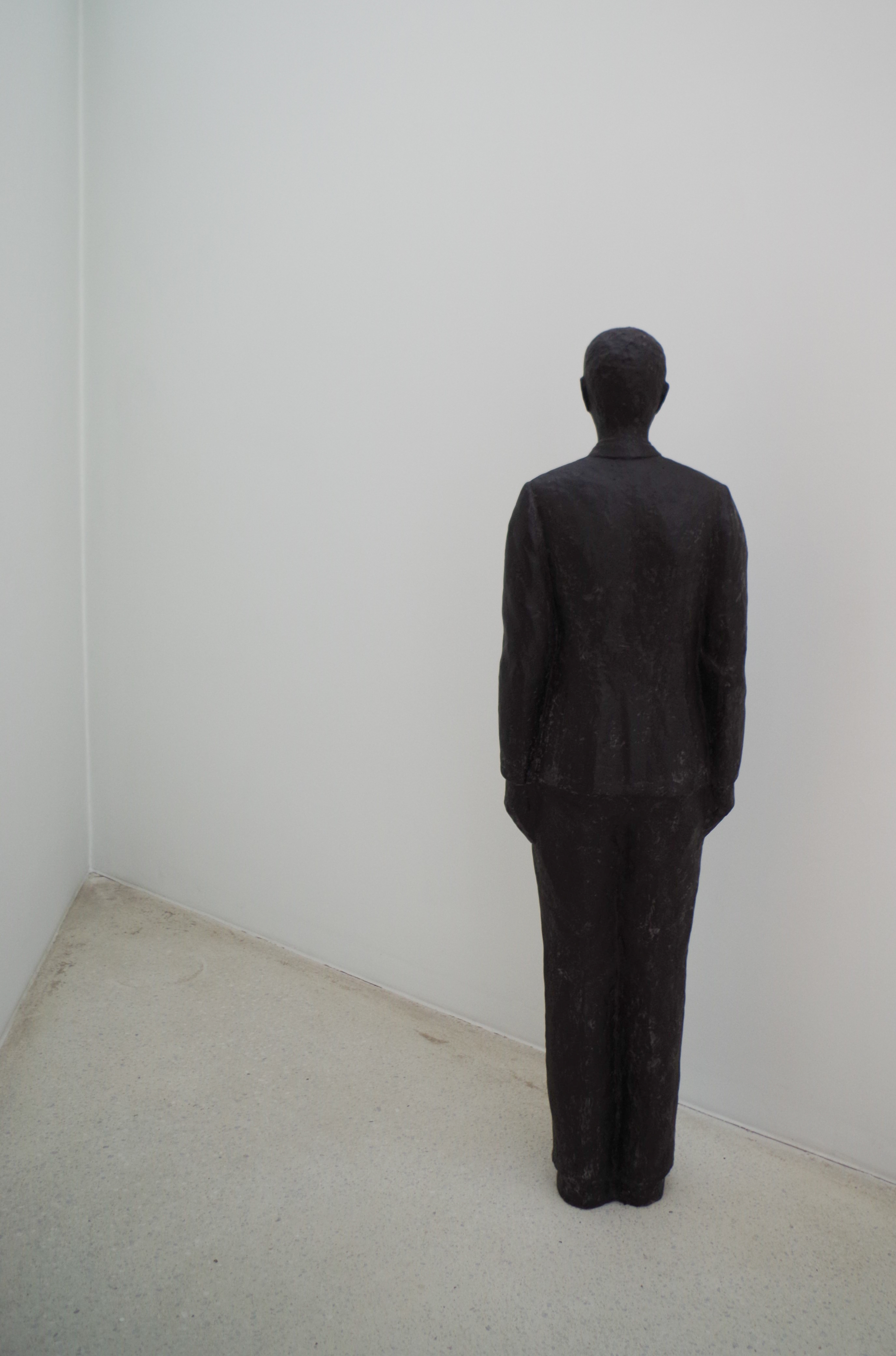
The Wall, in the Kazerne Dossin – Memorial in Mechelen

Philip Aguirre y Otegui (born 1961 in Schoten) is a Belgian artist who mainly works as a sculptor and painter. His work usually centers around migration and refugees, water, and the shelter of architecture.

His father Juan Martin Aguirre originally came from Las Arenas, in Spanish Basque Country, but moved as a child to Antwerp, Belgium in 1936, when the Spanish Civil War started. His mother's family suffered under the German occupation and the persecution of Jews in Belgium during the second World War. Aguirre studied in Antwerp and now lives in Borgerhout.

In 2017 he won the International Award for Public Art for his 2010 installation Théatre Source in Douala, Cameroon. In 2015 a 45-minute documentary with a voice-over by Jan Decleir, about the making of this work was created by cineast Koen Van den Bril. It showed how a muddy well was transformed in 9 months time into a meeting place for a village. Art publisher Ludion also made a book about the installation.

His work is influenced by Frans Masereel (for the humanistic vision and the effort to bring art to the people), the sculptors Constantin Brâncuși and Alberto Giacometti, photographer Manuel Alvarez Bravo, and contemporary Belgian artist Francis Alÿs.

He is a nephew of TV presenter Phara de Aguirre.

== Major works ==
- 1996: Fountain, Koolkaai, Antwerp
- 2001 The carrier of the mattress, concrete sculpture in Brussels Airport
- 2009: Gaalgui, wooden sculpture, Nieuwpoort
- 2010-2013: Théatre Source, a monumental work with a well and a staircase, in Douala, Cameroon
- 2016: Cabinet Mare Nostrum, painting
- 2016: Still (the) Barbarians, installation
- 15 August 1942, Lange Kievitstraat, Antwerpen, sculpture in the Kazerne Dossin – Memorial about the first razzia against Jews in Belgium
- Fallen dictator
- Karel van Miert, a 5-metre-high (16 ft) sculpture in Oud-Turnhout
- The man of Flanders, City hall, Kaprijke
- Water sculpture, Provinciehuis, Antwerp
- Water carrier, bronze, University of Antwerp. Also exists in beeswax.

== Major solo exhibitions ==
- 2008: Middelheim Open Air Sculpture Museum, Antwerp
- 2013: Mu.ZEE, Ostend

== Bibliography ==
- Sculptures, an overview of his sculptural work from 1985 until 2007
