= Mu.ZEE =

- Kunstmuseum aan Zee
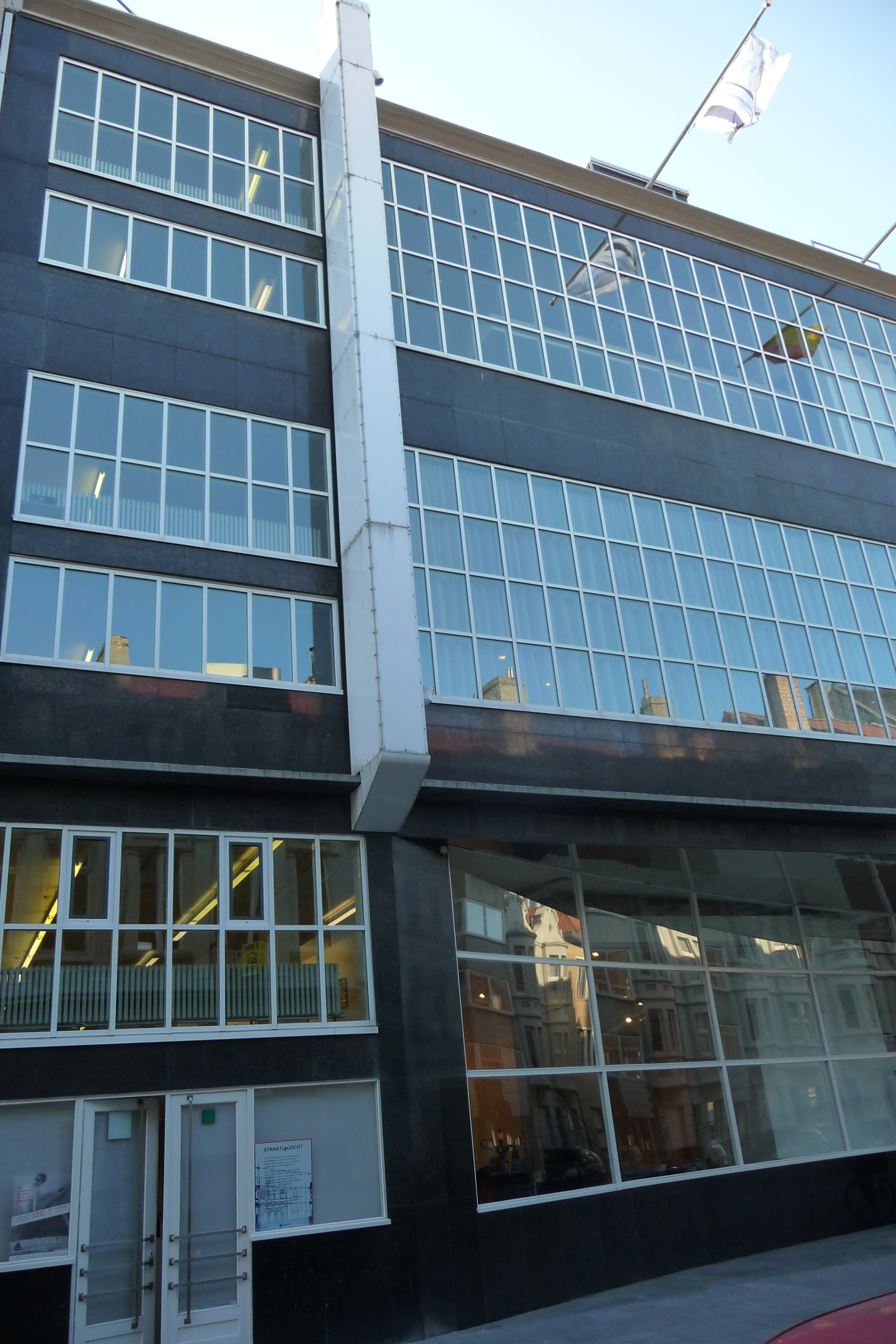
- Mu.ZEE

- Location within Belgium
- Established: 2008
- Location: Ostend, West Flanders, Belgium
- Coordinates: 51.225665°N 2.914601°E
- Type: Art museum and gallery
- Collections: Belgian art from 1830 onwards
- Collection size: 3,500
- Director: Phillip Van den Bossche
- Architect: Gaston Eysselinck
- Parking: On site
- Website: www.muzee.be

The Mu.ZEE is a museum in Ostend, Belgium, specializing in Belgian art from 1830 onwards. It was created in 2008 by the fusion of the former Provinciaal Museum voor Moderne Kunst (PMMK, the museum for modern art of the Province of West-Flanders) and the Museum voor Schone Kunsten Oostende (Museum of Fine Arts Ostend), both located in Ostend. The museum has two dependencies, the Ensorhuis (house of James Ensor) in Ostend, and the Permekemuseum in Jabbeke. Mu.ZEE is an abbreviation of "Kunstmuseum aan Zee" ("Art Museum at the Sea").

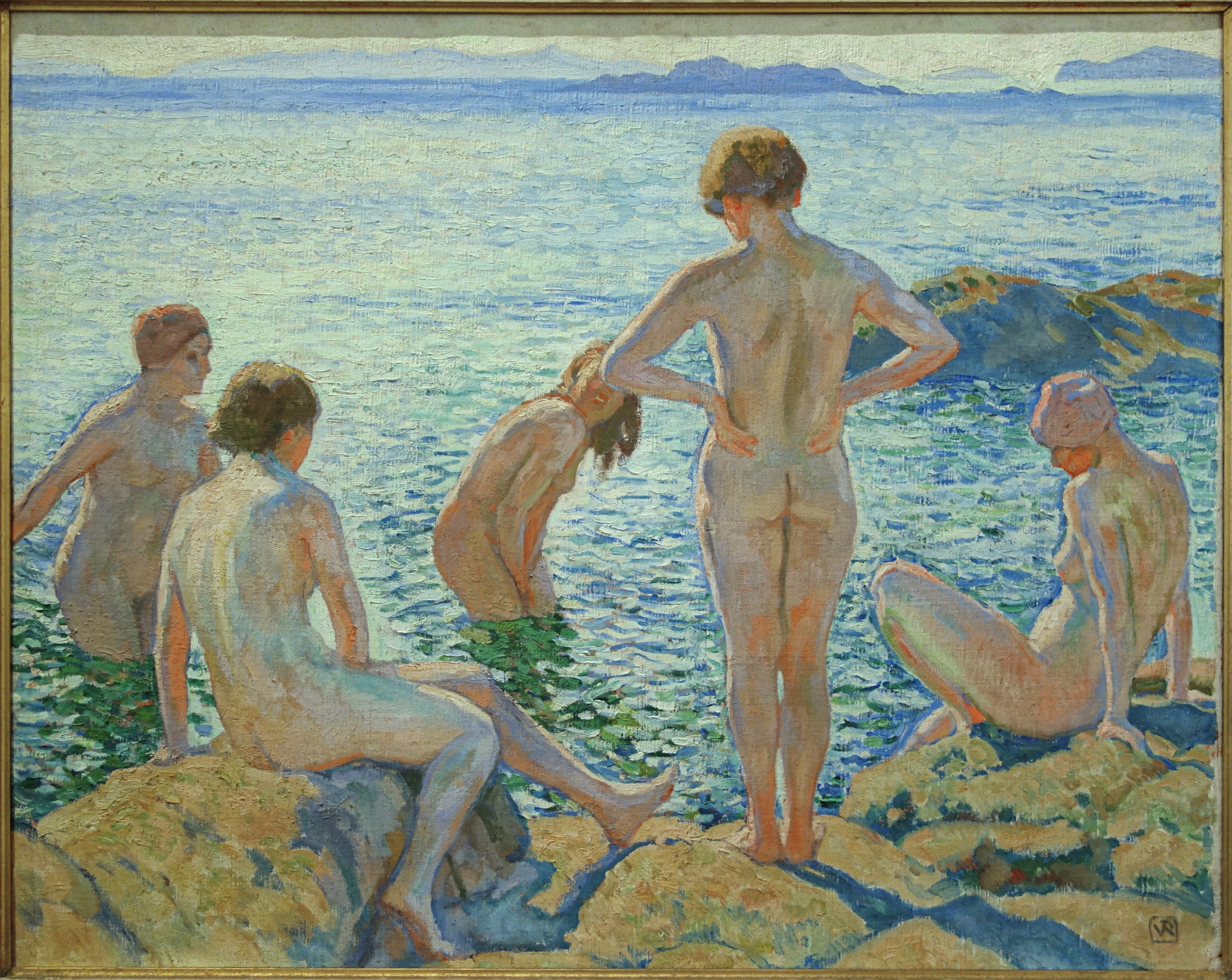
"Bathing women" (ca. 1920) by Théo van Rysselberghe

== History ==
The history of the Museum of Fine Arts of the Stad Ostend starts in 1885, with a large gift by a private art collector. In 1897, a museum was created to house the collection. An air raid in 1940 destroyed the library and archive and some 400 works of art. A new building was opened in 1958. The collection is largely centered on artists from Ostend, mainly James Ensor, Constant Permeke and Léon Spilliaert.

The collection of the Provincial Museum started in 1957, with the regular acquisition of works by young artists. In 1960, the house of Constant Permeke and a collection of his work was bought, and turned into the Permekemuseum. From 1962 until 1985, the main collection was exhibited in Bruges and Ypres, until a definitive location was found in 1986 in Ostend.

== Collection ==
The collection is mainly focused on Belgian art from 1850 to the present, with special attention to the end of the 19th century and the start of the 20th century. The museum has about 3500 objects (paintings, drawings and etchings), including 180 works by Léon Spilliaert, 350 works by Paul Joostens, and a large collection of works by Ensor, Permeke and nl:Jean Brusselmans. Other artists represented include Georges Vantongerloo, Roger Raveel, Raoul De Keyser, Panamarenko, Jacques Verduyn, Wim Delvoye, Jan Fabre, Philip Aguirre y Otegui, Karel Appel, Marcel Broodthaers, Antoon De Clerck, Etienne Elias, Luc Tuymans, nl:Walter Leblanc, Marie-Jo Lafontaine, Pierre Alechinsky, Guy van Bossche, Amedee Coutier, René Magritte, George Minne, Emil Salkin, nl:Jef Verheyen, Vic Gentils and Paul Delvaux.

== Selected solo exhibitions ==
- 2008: Marc Camille Chaimowicz
- 2009: Jan Vercruysse
- 2009: Jef Geys
- 2009: Daan van Golden
- 2010: James Ensor
- 2011: On Kawaras
- 2012: Anne-Mie Van Kerckhoven
- 2012: Jos de Gruyter & Harald Thys
- 2013: André Cadere

== Building ==
The museum is located in a protected modernist building by architect nl:Gaston Eysselinck from 1947, originally a department store. From 1986 on it was the location of the PMMK, and in 2008 it became the seat of Mu.ZEE.
