= Jeff Kowatch =

American painter (born 1965)

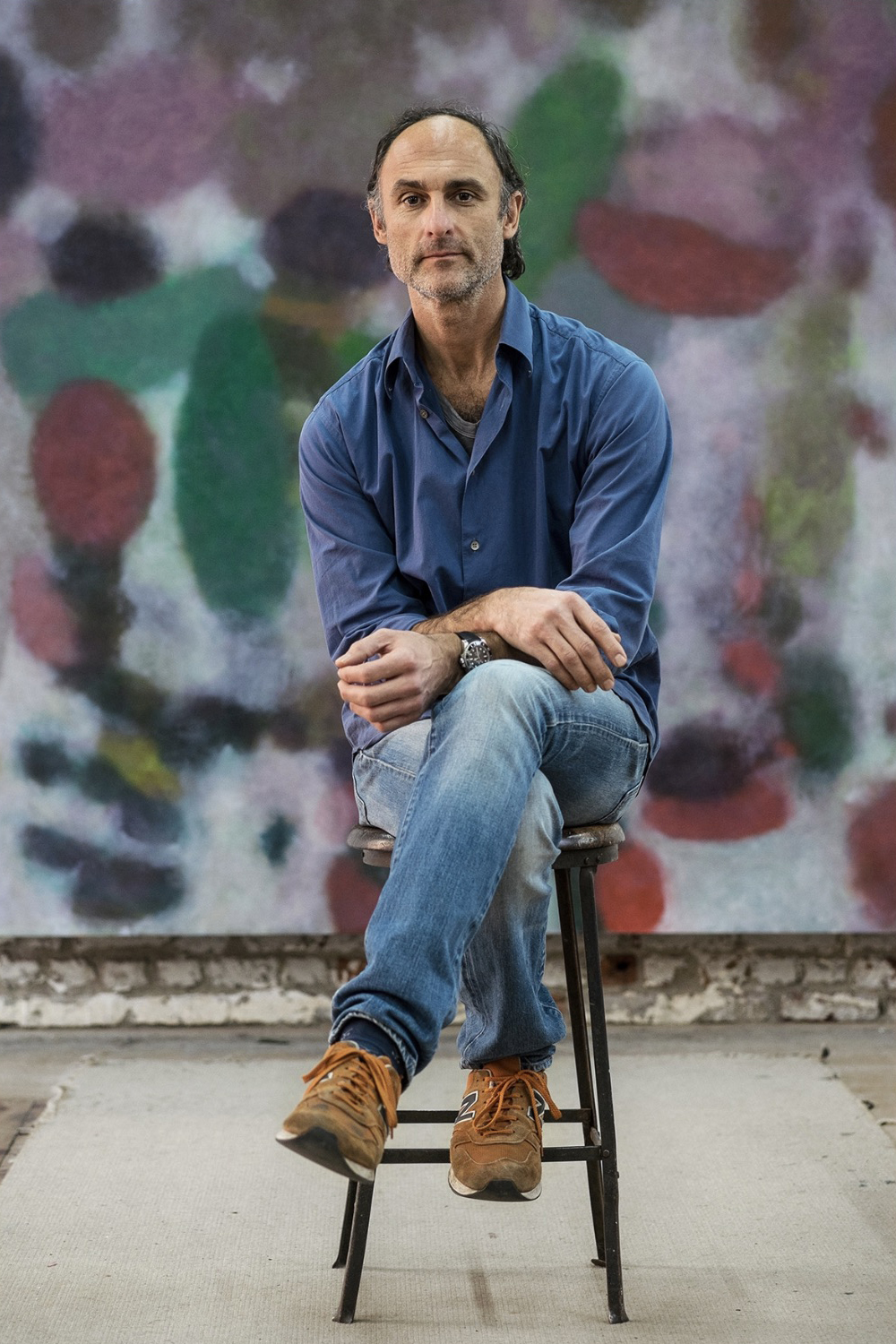
- Jeff Kowatch in 2019
- Born: December 26, 1965 (age 60); Los Angeles, California (United States)
- Style: Painter
- Movement: Contemporary Art
- Website: www.jeffkowatch.com

Jeff Kowatch (born 1965 in Los Angeles) is an American painter.

== Works ==
Kowatch is an abstract painter. His work is inspired by religion, literature, landscape, and the history of painting, and forms a chronological series of paintings and drawings.

=== Beginning ===
Jeff Kowatch is born in a middle-class American family of Italian, Hungarian and Irish ascent. His family was not very fond of art. Kowatch started painting thanks to his parents' neighbor, who used to paint in her garage. Then, at the age of ten, Kowatch's mother registered him in an oil painting class that took place in an arts and crafts supply shop.

=== Technique ===
Kowatch has developed a glazing technique inspired by the old Flemish masters, especially by Rembrandt, whose medium recipe he has adopted. This gives his paintings a lot of depth. Each of his paintings is composed of up to one hundred layers of oil paint.

The Belgian art critic Roger Pierre Turine sees in him a link between the technique of the old Flemish painters and American painters such as Brice Marden, with whom Kowatch became acquainted with, when he exhibited at the Earl McGrath Gallery, in New York and Los Angeles.

=== Inspiration and series ===
During his childhood in California, Kowatch has been deeply marked by his catholic upbringing. From his late teenage years, he developed a need for spirituality, that he expressed through painting. His early series were thus inspired by religious themes: Apostles (1989-1994), BVM (The Blessed Virgin Mary, 1994–1998), Salome (1998-2002) and Thou Shalt (2003).

His following series were an homage to the old masters, entitled Riffs on Old Masters (2003-2004). He also completed two series inspired by landscapes, Status Mountainous Cumulus (2006-2009) and Ponds (2012-2013).

Literature is also a source of inspiration for Kowatch. Two of his series are entitled Don Quixote (2009-2012) and Moby Dick (2013) respectively, and form a tribute to the heroes’ epic journeys. Kowatch is also inspired by Belgium and has drawn on his own personal adventure in his series Belgium Odyssey (2014).

From 2016, Kowatch has been inspired by the themes of the circus and carnival. He produced his largest painting, Christ Leaving Brussels, in response to James Ensor's The Entry of Christ Into Brussels. This painting has been acquired by the Royal Fine Arts Museums of Belgium in 2018.

In 2018, the Full Circle series pursued the circus and carnival themes. The same year, Galerie La Forest Divonne and Galerie Faider joined forces in Brussels to show two exhibitions of those works. Michel Draguet (Director of the Royal Museums of Fine Arts) talks of passion and ardour, while Claude Lorent writes about art works "monumental, powerful […] expressionist by the graphic strength, tonic and fervent".

From 2020 to 2021, Kowatch develops a series called Man Jok, a reference to his zen buddhism name, which he received after years of practice. Through this series, the painter strengthens the link between his meditative process and his work. Roger Pierre Turine evokes the paintings sonority, serenity and their balance between movement, colours and composition, and the journalist Paloma de Boismorel calls Kowatch a "prophet of colour".

=== Works in public collections ===
- Royal Museums of Fine Arts, Belgium
- Long Beach Museum of Art, Long Beach, CA
- Laguna Art Museum, Laguna Beach, CA
- Union Theological Seminary, New York

== Articles ==
- 2021
  - Roger Pierre Turine, Triplé gagnant pour Jeff Kowatch, Arts Libre, Oct. 2021 (FR)
  - Paloma de Boismorel, Prophète de la couleur, GAEL Magazine, Oct. 2021 (FR)
  - Estelle Magalhàes, Jeff Kowatch invite à la méditation, Mu in the city, Sept. 2021 (FR)
  - Aliénor Debrocq, Jeff Kowatch en plénitude, MAD - Le Soir, Sept. 2021 (FR)
  - Johan-Frédérik Hel Guedj, Le Brussels Gallery Weekend vous prend par la main, L'Echo, Sept. 2021 (FR)
- 2020
  - Aliénor Debrocq, Trilogie estivale, MAD - Le Soir, July 2020 (FR)
- 2019
  - Patrick Ogle, Jeff Kowatch, Based in Belgium Went From Copying The Old Masters As A Child To Creating, Unique, Unmistakable Work On Dibond Aluminum Composite, Manapare.us, Nov. 2019
  - Jean-Marie Wynants, Art on Paper : le dessin n'est plus timide, Le Soir, Oct. 2019 (FR)
- 2018
  - Claude Lorent, Le pictural en son incandescence et son intériorité, Arts libre Belgique, Nov 2018 (FR) English version here
  - Aliénor Debrocq, Sensualité zen, Mad Le soir Belgique, Nov 2018 (FR) English version here
  - Muriel de Crayencour, Jeff Kowatch, Champignons magiques, Mu in the City, Dec. 2018 (FR)
- 2017
  - Muriel de Crayencour, Jeff Kowatch, Dans l'atelier de Jeff Kowatch, Mu - in the City, March 2017 (FR)
- 2016
  - Muriel de Crayencour, Jeff Kowatch, Carnavals, Mu in the City, nov.24 (FR) English version here
  - Claude Lorent, La couleur joyeuse pour masquer l’apocalypse, Arts Libres, Nov.4 (FR) English version here
  - Claude Lorent, En suspension, Arts Libre, Feb.12 (FR) English version here
- 2014
  - Pascal Goffaut, L’info culturelle, RTBF, Radio interview, Oct. 22
  - Claude Lorent, Des tonalités de chez nous, Arts Libre, Sep.19 (FR) English version here
- 2013
  - Vincent Delaury, Magazine L'Oeil, Jeff Kowatch, Oct. 2013
- 2012
  - Claude Lorent, Peindre toute l’énergie de l’éblouissement, Arts Libre, Sep. 24 2009 (FR) English version here
  - Piet Swimberghe, Wolken boven Californië, Knack Weekend, June 3–9
- 2005
  - Michael Boodro, Designer's Dozen, ELLE Decor US edition, May
- 2004
  - Piet Swimberghe, Zen aan de Zavel, Knack Weekend, April 7–13
- 2003
  - Ethical Strokes - Thou Shalt Paint, The New York Sun, November 19
- 1998
  - Claire Mc Cardell and Friedlander Lee, Art, New York Magazine, October 26
  - Ken Johnson, Jeff Kowatch at Earl McGrath, The New York Times, Oct. 23
- 1994
  - Daniel Cariaga, Music Review : An Ear-Opening ‘Concierto’ at LACMA, Los Angeles Times, July 12

== Documentary ==
- Tout le Baz'art with Jeff Kowatch by Hadja Lahbib, Arte, documentary of 26 min, may 2019
- Jeff Kowatch, Christ leaving Brussels, RTBF Culture, text by Patrick de Lamalle, acquisition by Musées Royaux des Beaux-Arts of Belgium, 2019

== Bibliography ==
=== Publications ===
- Grand cru. Gribouillages et griffonnages. 1985-1995, Jeff Kowatch, Collection Alentours, Editions Tandem, 2021, ISBN 978-2-87349-145-1, 88 p., text in French.
- Conversation with Paul Émond, Jeff Kowatch, Editions Tandem, 2016, ISBN 978-2-87349-125-3 ; text in English and French.

=== Catalogues ===
- Jeff Kowatch, Full Circle, text by Michel Draguet, edited by Galerie la Forest Divonne and Faider, Nov. 2018, 72 p., text in English and French.
- Jeff Kowatch, 2012, texts of Laline Paull, by Audrey Bazin and Melissa Mathison, edited by Earl McGrath Gallery, Galerie Vieille du temple and ne9enpuntne9en, 2009, ISBN 978-90-9023-701-5 ; text in English, Dutch and French.
