= The Oyster Eater (Ensor) =

Painting by James Ensor

- La mangeuse d'huîtres (French)
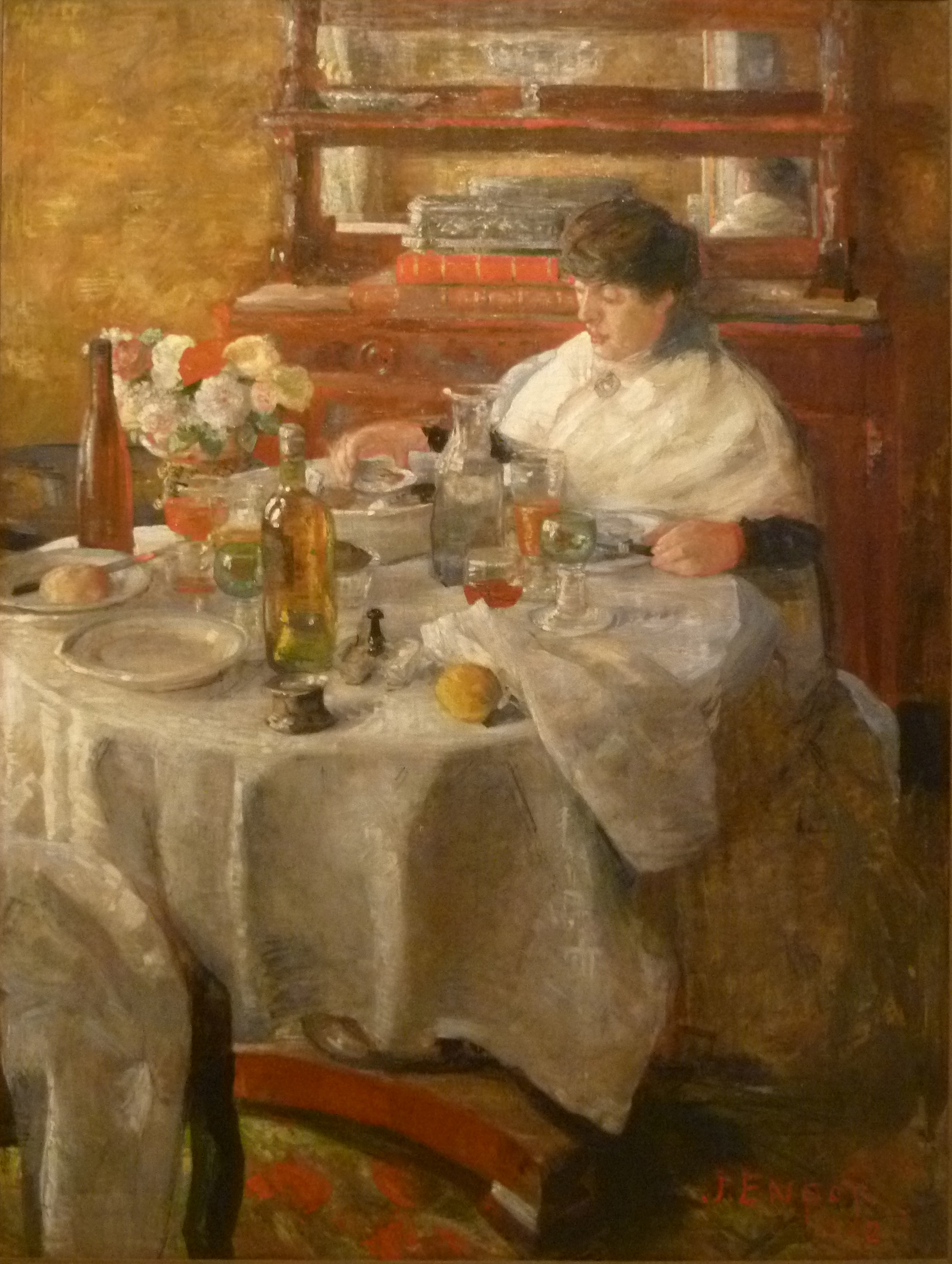
- Artist: James Ensor
- Year: 1882
- Medium: Oil on canvas
- Dimensions: 207 cm × 150 cm (81 in × 59 in)
- Location: Royal Museum of Fine Arts Antwerp; Antwerp

The Oyster Eater is an oil painting executed in 1882 by the Belgian Expressionist artist James Ensor which is now in the collection of the Royal Museum of Fine Arts, Antwerp.

The genre work depicts the artist's sister Mitche eating oysters on her own at a well-appointed table replete with flowers, plates, wine and table linen. Although painted in an impressionist style Ensor himself disassociated himself from the French movement. Whilst in agreement with them that light and colour were more important than line, for him light in particular had an almost spiritual value.

However the painting was refused by the Antwerp Salon of 1882, possibly because of the sexual overtones suggested by a single young woman eating oysters, then considered an aphrodisiac. In this respect the painting can be compared with Jan Steen's salacious The Oyster Eater of 1680. When also rejected by the alternative exhibitors l'Essor the following year, Ensor and his associates were provoked into establishing their own group, Les XX, to hold their own exhibitions of avant-garde works.

== Description ==
A young woman enjoys a gastronomic feast at a table set for two. It is Ensor's sister, Mitche (Mariette). The absence of her table companion is not alarming. The carelessly left napkin suggests that he has only just left the table. Perhaps it was the artist himself who wanted to portray the scene. He placed his easel on the right, close to the table. The scene is set in their parental home in Ostend, which can still be visited today as the Ensor House Museum. It was built in 1874 and looked like most bourgeois houses of the time. It had two shops on the ground floor and a few rooms for rent. The furniture with some books is still part of the current Ensor house museum.

The oyster-eater belongs to the series that he named The Burger Salon. That was a series of moments in the life of the small-town bourgeoisie. Compared to earlier works, the richer material differentiation is striking. In The Oyster Eater, Ensor set to work with light colours. The illusion of sunshine is created by the red, yellow and orange hues in the work. It is the bright color of its mature years. It soon becomes clear that the artist did not want to make an unambiguous portrait of his sister in her familiar environment. After all, he seems to lose himself in the endless variation, nuance, repetition and contrast of colours. One time he spreads the paint thinly and smoothly, the other time he opts for heavy, masonry stains that he applies with a palette knife.

== See also ==
- List of paintings by James Ensor
