= Skeletons Fighting over a Hanged Man =

Painting by James Ensor

- Squelettes se disputant un pendu (French)
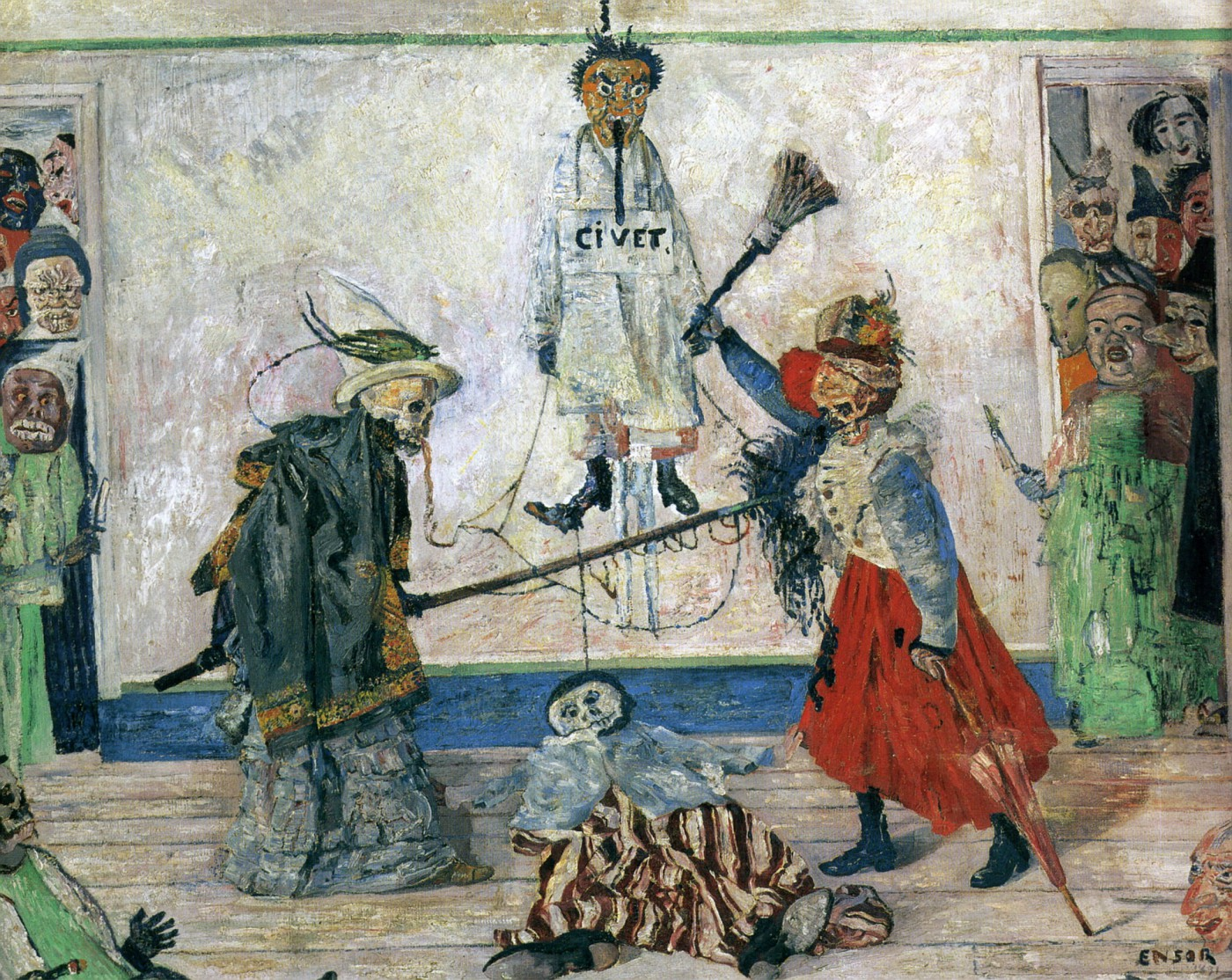
- Artist: James Ensor
- Year: 1891
- Medium: Oil on canvas
- Dimensions: 59 cm × 74 cm (23 in × 29 in)
- Location: Royal Museum of Fine Arts Antwerp; Antwerp

Skeletons Fighting over a Hanged Man is an 1891 oil painting by the Belgian symbolist painter James Ensor which is in the collection of the Royal Museum of Fine Arts Antwerp.

== Description and analysis ==
The work depicts an on-stage drama in which two skeletons dressed in masks and women's clothing are fighting with traditional female weapons such as brooms and umbrellas. Behind them hangs a dead body described as "civet", the French description for a hare stew. In both wings, extras wearing masks and carrying knives are watching the fight. A loose web connects the body to the combatants.

One interpretation of the work is that the two quarrelling women represent Ensor's wife and mistress and he the helpless body over which they fight. An alternative more androgynous interpretation is that the quarrelsome pair represent Ensor's embittered view of his critics where he again is the powerless prize; the people in the wings would in this case represent the public, some for and some against his art.

== See also ==
- List of paintings by James Ensor
