= The Oyster Eater =

Painting by Jan Steen

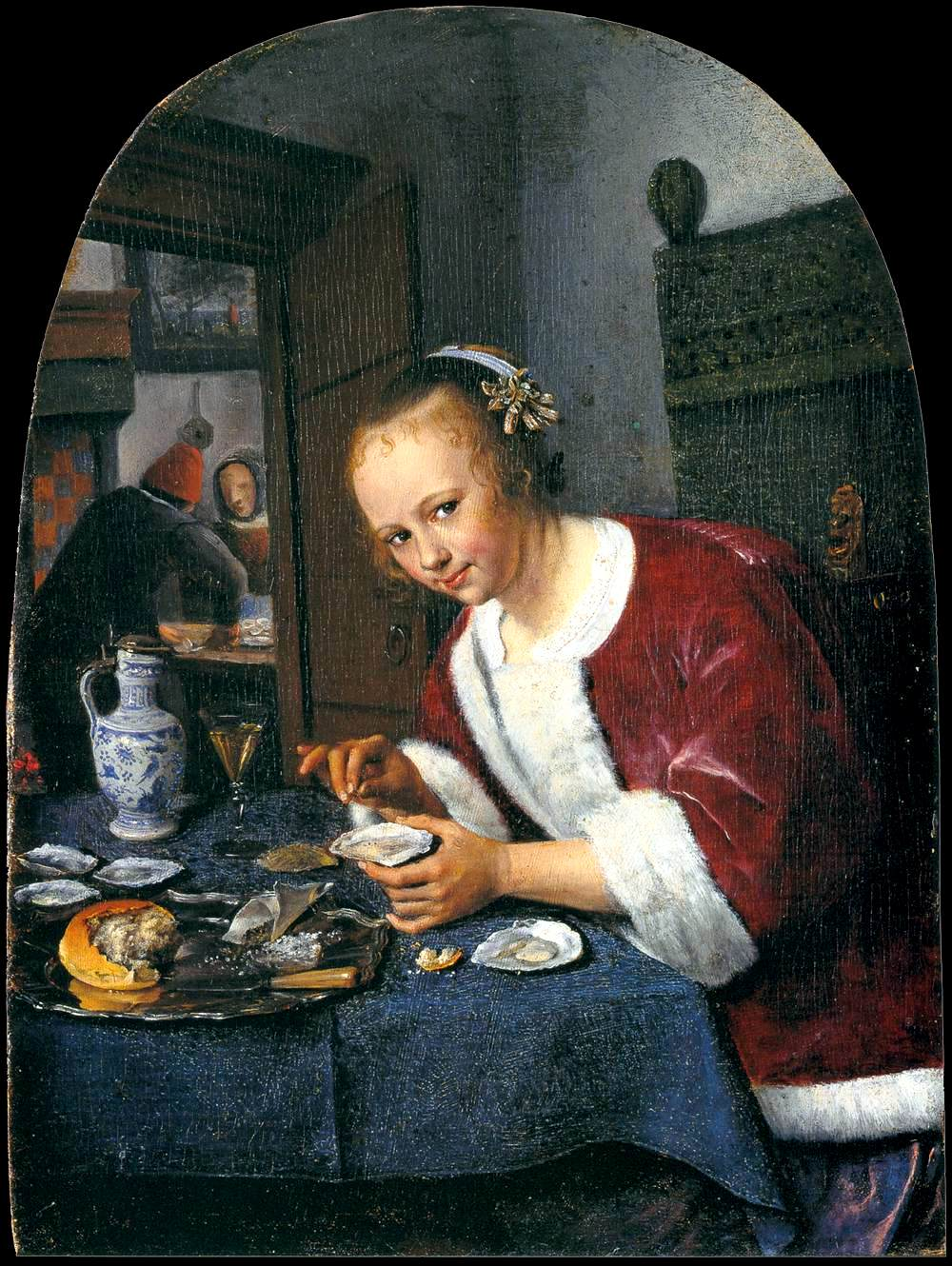
Jan Steen, The Oyster Eater or Girl Offering Oysters, 1658–1660, oil on panel

The Oyster Eater (Dutch: Het oestereetstertje) or Girl Offering Oysters (Meisje, oesters aanbiedend) is a small oil-on-panel painting by Jan Steen dating to c.1658–1660. Since 1936, it has been in the collection of the Mauritshuis in the Hague. It is a genre painting that demonstrates Steen's intricate style and use of domestic settings. It also shows Steen's use of symbolism with oysters to create a theme of earthly lust.

== Visual analysis ==
=== Subject matter ===
The main subject of the painting is a young woman salting oysters while making direct eye contact with the viewer. Her expression is flirtatious and communicates to viewers that she is salting the oysters for them.

=== Composition ===
In The Oyster Eater, Steen uses framing to create a complicated yet skillful composition. He uses the vertical and horizontal lines of the door frame, bed curtains, and the edge of the table to create an imaginary border around the young woman. The arched top of the painting reflects the curvature of the girl's head and left shoulder. The placement of objects such as the oyster point in a specific direction, allowing the viewer's eye to focus on the figures in the back room. The placement of the background figures in a separate room is common in Dutch paintings and is referred to as doorsien (view through a doorway). This technique also allows the viewer's eye to plunge into the background of a painting. Artists like Steen added doorsien to paintings to create an atmosphere of diligence and desire among the subjects. The use of doorsien also adds a sense of balance between the men in the background and the young woman in the foreground.

=== Symbolism ===
In the context of this painting, the oysters convey an erotic meaning. Oysters are thought to be an aphrodisiac, the most seductive being the ones that are rich and full. Empty oyster shells or oysters placed alongside other partially eaten items like in The Oyster Eater imply the temporariness of earthly pleasures, a commonly repeated theme in Dutch art. During the seventeenth century, shells started to make appearances in several Dutch genre paintings or merry company paintings. They were objects of scientific interest to the Dutch who were interested in science and history. Oysters also held an exotic connotation as many featured in Dutch paintings were from different continents, and they were used because they were seen as ancient souvenirs of the past. In paintings that specifically included oysters, they were depicted as oyster meals. Merry company paintings are thought to have originated from early sixteenth-century Flemish mythological paintings. Oysters were a reminder of ancient times and symbolized Aphrodite, the goddess of love, fertility, pleasure, and sex throughout antiquity and all the way into Baroque art. Oysters typically appeared in mythological paintings where Aphrodite and Dionysus were the main deities depicted. The use of the oyster meal in Dutch genre paintings has been separated into two time periods. The first time period lasted approximately from 1610 to 1635. During this time, oysters were shown being consumed in merry company paintings. Before the second time period, the Dutch government acquired control of pearl fisheries in Indian waters in 1658. This happened as a result of conquering the Portuguese. The pearl fisheries led to the development of oyster fisheries, which led to a new interest in the depiction of oysters in genre paintings. In the second time period, which went from 1660 to 1680, oyster paintings were painted in more private settings. Oyster meal paintings of the second time period were all set indoors and displayed some sort of a domestic interior. Unlike the earlier merry company paintings that portrayed feasts, these later oyster paintings usually portrayed some kind of private, romantic meeting.

== Style ==
=== Influences ===
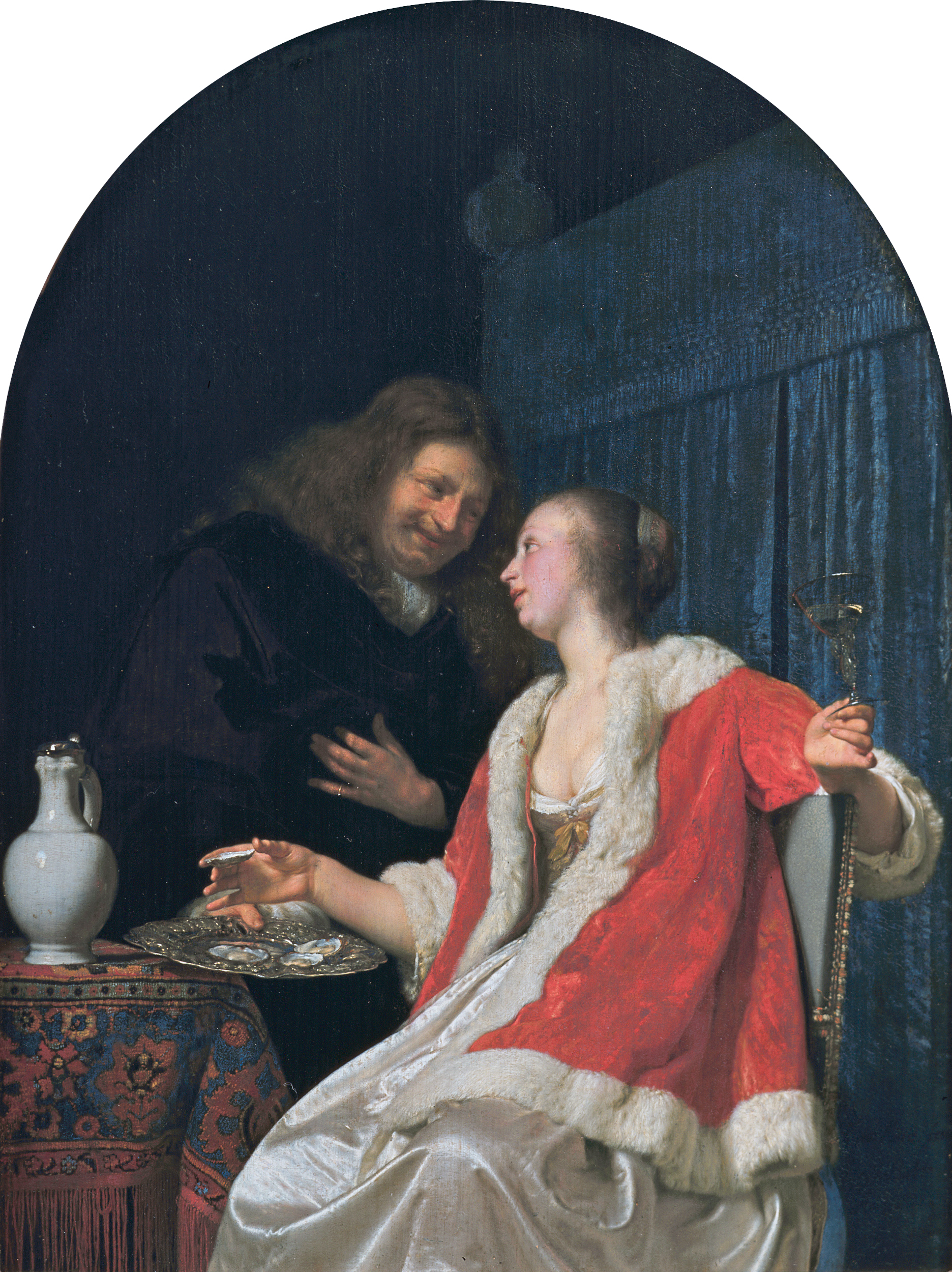
Frans van Mieris the Elder, The Oyster Meal, 1661, oil on panel

The style of Steen's The Oyster Eater comes close to the elegant style of Frans van Mieris the Elder. Particularly, the arched top, small size, and extreme care of every small detail resemble the works of Gerrit Dou, who was the great master of "fine painting" in Leiden and Mieris' teacher.

== Historical context ==
Steen's The Oyster Eater is one of his many genre paintings. These paintings generally included earthy humor, sometimes with satirical overtones. They expressed the Dutch whim for portraiture, love of the home and family, and for moralistic messages, all typically found in domestic settings. Steen typically depicted his subjects in a favorable or gratifying manner. However, he would also make fun of his subjects by exposing their foolishness or strangeness.

== Themes ==
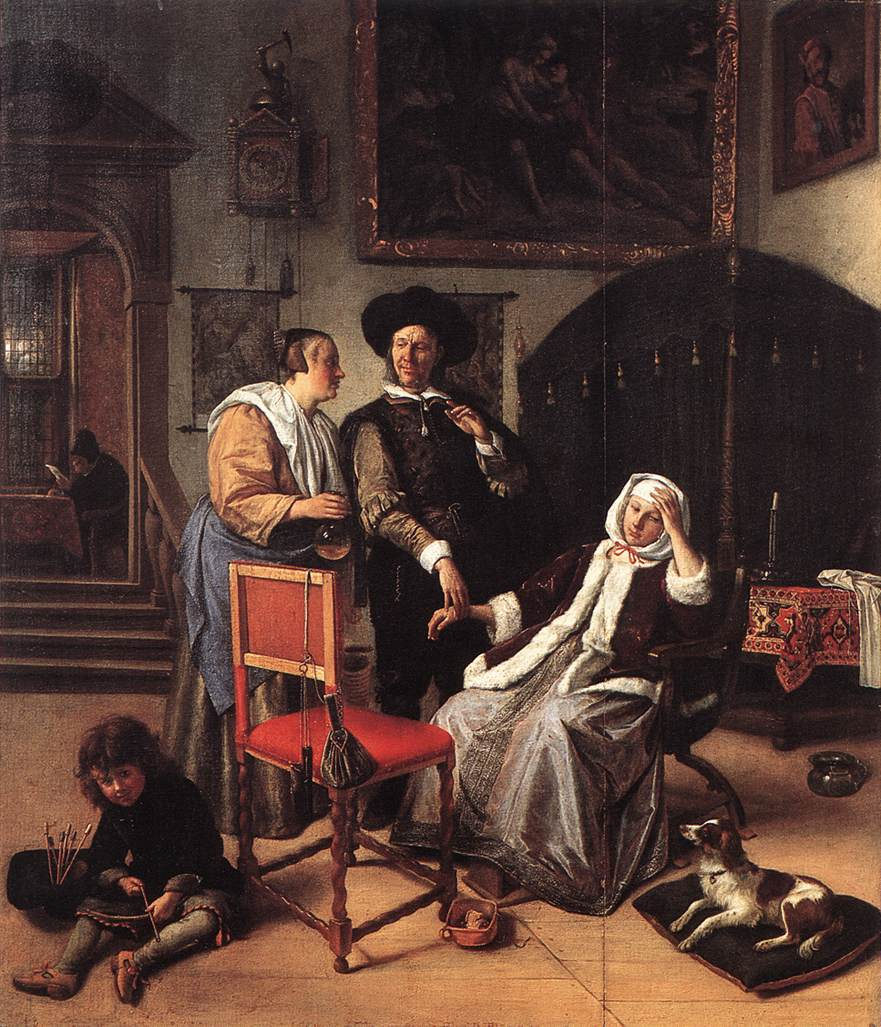
Jan Steen, The Physician's Visit, 1660–1662, oil on canvas

Steen had an interest in the theme of love: contemporary or ancient. He used love to expose the passion and vulnerability that overcomes humans when they are in love. His use of humor in genre paintings helped to convey the follies of love in a relatable way. Genre paintings of his that show a love theme include subjects such as marriage, brothel scenes, and the treatment of lovesickness (The Physician's Visit). Steen depicts two different kinds of love in his genre paintings: sacred love and profane love. Steen's paintings of sacred love, such as The Marriage of Tobias and Sarah, show a young, innocent love that makes the subjects oblivious to everything else in the world. Steen's works depicting profane love associate love and desire with the follies of the world. These paintings demonstrate concepts of lust, incest, and mass abduction. One example of Steen's profane love images is Easy Come, Easy Go which also uses oysters as a symbol of lust.

== Provenance ==
The whereabouts of The Oyster Eater before 1783 are unknown. The painting is known to have been owned by Pieter Locquet who sold it to Pieter van Winter in Amsterdam in September 1783. Van Winter passed it along to his daughter, Lucretia Johanna van Winter, in 1822. The painting was in her possession all throughout her marriage to Hendrik Six van Hillegom. Then, it was inherited and kept by Jan Pieter and Pieter Hendrik Six van Vromade until 1905. The Oyster Eater was left to Jan Pieter's son, Professor Jan Six, who owned it until the 1920s. In 1928, it was sold again to Beets of Deterding. The painting was gifted to the Mauritshuis by Sir Henri Deterding in 1936.
