= The Intrigue (painting) =

Painting by James Ensor

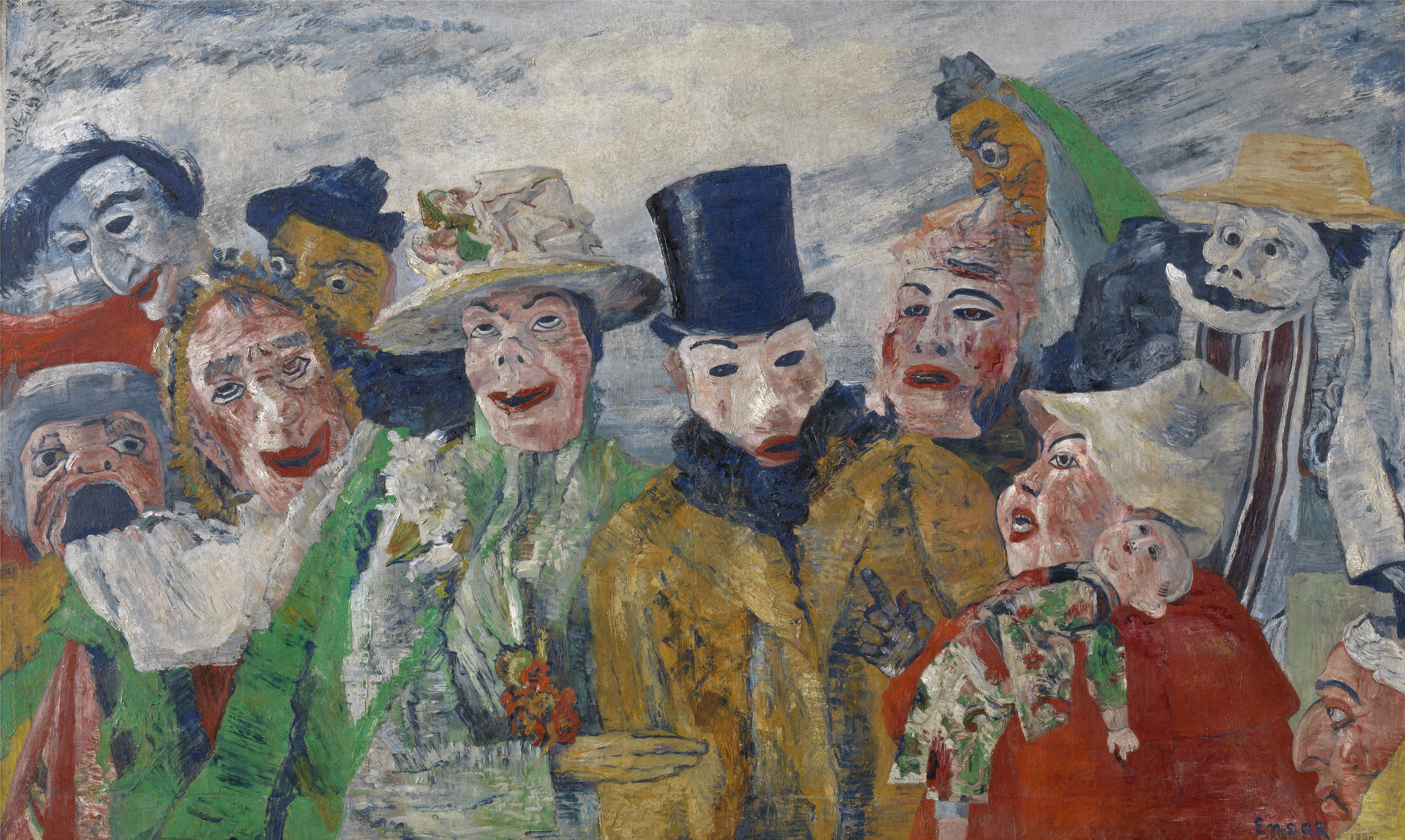
- Artist: James Ensor
- Year: 1890
- Medium: Oil on canvas
- Dimensions: 90 cm × 149 cm (35 in × 59 in)
- Location: Royal Museum of Fine Arts Antwerp, Antwerp

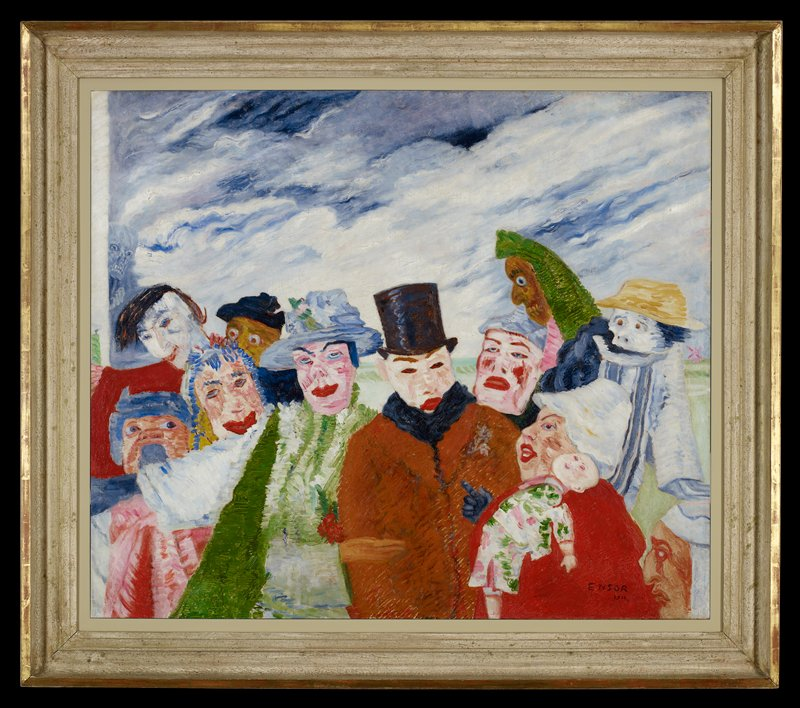
1911 Minneapolis version

The Intrigue is an oil-on-canvas painting created by Belgian expressionist painter James Ensor in 1890. This painting is in the possession of Royal Museum of Fine Arts Antwerp and is part of the official inventory of Flemish masterpieces. Ensor painted a second version in 1911, which is now in the Minneapolis Institute of Art.

The use of masks in Ensor's paintings is prevalent. The masks and the use of colours increase the expressive quality of the painting. The sharp contrast that is created through the use of pure colours on white canvas is a follow-up on French impressionist traditions.

== Description ==
The painting consists of 11 figures who are all masked. In the centre of the painting, a woman is taking a man's hand with a triumphant smile. The masks are revealing the figures' characters instead of hiding them. In the right corner of the painting, a woman is holding a doll or a dead baby. The colourful bodies create a contrast with the white background.

This painting is labelled as "grotesque" and "a group portrait". This painting might still be considered as a realistic picture because of its few references to accurate depiction of the outside world, for instance the colour of the sky.

== Source of inspiration ==
Although Ensor is often categorised along with Vincent van Gogh and Edvard Munch as an expressionist artist, with The Intrigue he manifests his inclinations towards the path of Hieronymus Bosch and Pieter Brueghel the elder in drawing and creating bizarre images.

The story behind the painting is autobiographical and inspired by an actual event during Ensor's life. It depicts his sister's marriage with a Chinese art dealer from Berlin that caused a scandal in Ensor's hometown.

== See also ==
- List of paintings by James Ensor
