= The Lovesick Maiden =

Painting by Jan Steen

Paintings of physicians by Jan Steen
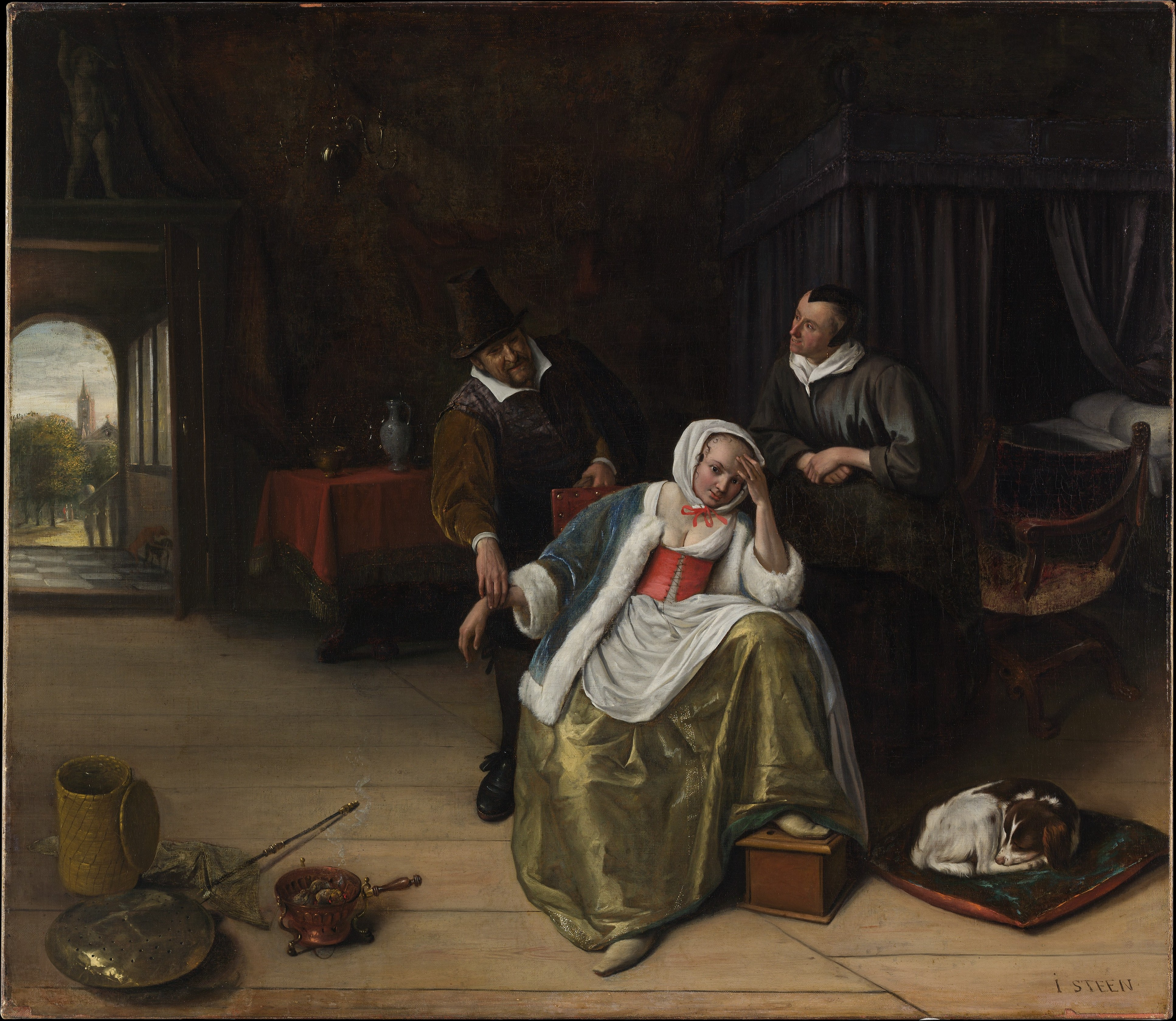
- Artist: Jan Steen
- Year: c. 1660
- Medium: oil paint, canvas
- Dimensions: 86.4 cm (34.0 in) × 99.1 cm (39.0 in)
- Location: Metropolitan Museum of Art
- Accession: 46.13.2

The Lovesick Maiden is a c. 1660 oil-on-canvas genre painting by Jan Steen. It shows a young woman suffering from love-sickness surrounded by her doctor and a maid-servant. It is in the collection of the Metropolitan Museum of Art.

== Description ==
Jan Steen's The Lovesick Maiden depicts an indoor scene in a room belonging to a bourgeois family. The otherwise dark room has soft light illuminating the figures from a source in the front left side of the room, hidden behind the viewer's line of sight. A secondary source of light from the open doors allow additional illumination to flood the scene.

The focal point of this piece exists in the middle foreground where the three central figures are located. As the main subject, a young woman is seated on a chair with her left foot resting on a stool. Next to her, there is a man to the left known to be a doctor, holding the maiden's wrist with one hand and a bag with his other. To the right, an older woman stands behind the maiden, with her gaze fixed on the doctor.

In the foreground on the floor, there is an arrangement of items: a cloth, a bed warmer, a brazier, and a yellow basket containing a glass bottle. The combination of the glass bottle, commonly used to hold urine, and the brazier indicate the question of whether the young maiden is pregnant. In testing urine for determining pregnancy, the urine was first heated by the brazier. The righthand portion of the foreground contains a small dog curled up, asleep on a pillow next to the young woman's footstool.

The true middle ground of the painting contains, on the right; a chair and four-poster canopy bed, of which a curtain is drawn, revealing the bed as empty. In the middle, left of the bed is a table with a cloth, atop sits a vase and bowl, above the table hangs a black chandelier. In the left portion of the middle ground a statue of cupid resides on top of the doorway.

The background consists of the foyer and the landscape. In the foyer, two small dogs are seen making mating advances. The dream-like landscape of the far background indicates possible influence from Jan Van Goyen, talented and prominent landscape painter and father-in-law to Steen.

== Interpretation ==
There are two interpretations that explain at length the context, themes, and iconography present in The Lovesick Maiden and other paintings by Steen, consistent with the doctor's visit genre theme: Lovesickness, and hysteria. The first interpretation derived from this work is the theme of lovesickness. This theory has long been popular among many art historians and museum entries such as the description provided for this work by the Metropolitan Museum of Art, where the piece resides. The second interpretation of the context surrounding this piece originates from the ancient medical and social belief in hysteria. Laurinda Dixon introduced this second interpretation in 1995 with her book Perilous Chastity: Women and Illness in Pre-Enlightenment Art and Medicine. Dixon traces the origins of the Illness hysteria and provides a background for its prevalence in 17th Century Dutch art.

=== Lovesickness ===
When viewing Steen's Doctors visit genre paintings, at first glance it may seem like a normal doctor's visit, but on closer inspection there are many clues and iconographic symbols in the scene alluding to the idea that this piece is part of a lengthy 17th-century Dutch tradition of "doctor's visit" paintings that feature a comical theater scene of a quack and a love-sick maiden These recurring details or clues can be seen in the doctor in ridiculous theatrical dress, the nearby bed with an open curtain, the dog-on-a-pillow, the bed-warmer or burning coals, and the not-overly-concerned third person looking on. Jan Steen painted several of these, as did many of his contemporaries in Leiden. As is common in Steen paintings, his usage of a common genre often includes an underlying comedic message regarding the matter at hand, and in this case it is the pair of copulating dogs in the doorway. Though the specific theater scene is now lost, the main theme has been reconstructed: there is no "cure" for the young woman, because she is suffering from "love-sickness". In Steen's series of doctor's visit paintings, is unclear whether he is directing his judgement on the foolish doctor or the lovesick woman.

Perri Chapman writes in favor of the lovesickness theory. In Jan Steen, Painter, Storyteller, Chapman notes that although Steen left his doctor's visit paintings up to interpretation, the theme of lovesickness is obvious. Chapman states that although art historians, including Simon Schama, have researched in depth and searched wide to extrapolate a possible hidden meaning, the possibility of Steen's doctor's visit paintings having a deeper meaning than the surface-level elements that lead the viewer toward the conclusion of lovesickness, is highly unlikely.

=== Hysteria ===
The root of the second interpretation is the illness Hysteria. This affliction, first diagnosed in ancient times, was understood by the Dutch through vernacular texts and thought to be caused by a wandering uterus in women. Dixon's interpretation acknowledges the long-standing argument that The Lovesick Maiden, amongst other paintings following the same narrative, belongs to a comedic genre style of painting popular in Leiden in the 17th century, but inquires and explores a deeper motive, one interacting with the medical, moral and social beliefs surrounding women. This argument is further explained by the reality that although Hysteria, or "lovesickness" was commonly occurring amongst men as well in the 17th century, Steen and other genre painters depicting similar scenes almost exclusively commented only on the way it affected women. The exclusion of male lovesickness paintings from Steen and other artists from Leiden leads Dixon, author of Perilous Chastity: Women and Illness in Pre-Enlightenment Art and Medicine, to the conclusion that the intertwined nature of medicine and morality was used as a measure to ensure the continuation of the domesticity of women. Lovesickness is a guise for the depiction of hysteria in women, used to reflect medical beliefs at the time and influence the behavior of women. Images of lovesickness were used as negative reinforcements to remind viewers of the dangers and repercussions of sloth and celibacy.

There are certain details of this piece that lend themselves to either theories; The painting shows the doctor feeling his patient's wrist for a pulse. This occurrence and the inclusion of a bottle used for the testing of urine of lovesick women were accurate of medical practices in the 17th century for diagnosing lovesickness, or pregnancy. Iconographic symbols such as the Cupid statue, and the bedwarmer are also included in the double meaning, alluding to love or wandering womb syndrome.

== Iconography ==
Iconographic symbols are scattered in every section of Steen's The Lovesick Maiden. The most recognizable of which are; The cupid statue situated above the open doorway, the sleeping dog next to the maiden, and the two dogs mating in the foyer. Many iconographic motifs such as the sleeping dog at the feet of a figure, or the presence of cupid, prevalent symbols in Dutch painting symbolizing love and loyalty have a rich history, and can be identified in artwork even spanning back to the Roman Imperial time of 27 B.C.E- 476 C.E. The tapestry located on the back wall of the painting, although eroded is confirmed to be a scene of the god Apollo playing the violin. This iconographic motif was incorporated by Steen into the piece to display a common remedy at the time for melancholia, the medieval humor responsible for depression.

Other iconographic symbols might not be so obvious. Laurinda Dixon notes the connection between Doctor's visit paintings inclusion of animals such as dogs and horses, and the natural state of a woman's womb, which in 17th-century Dutch society was still believed to be wild and difficult to tame. The two dogs copulating in the background of the piece allude to both the wild and sexual nature of the womb and further insist on the necessity for the lovesick maiden to marry and become pregnant to cure her wandering womb.

Another symbol evident in all of Steen's doctor's visit genre paintings is the footstool containing a charcoal burner. These devices were especially popular in Northern Europe in places like Holland where the weather is cold. A woman would place the foot warmer under her skirt to combat the cold. While the footwarmer is a practical advice for everyday use, it also refers to both the cold, wet nature of women's bodies, a common belief at the time in Dutch society, and the cure for uterine fits which were known to be the cause of hysteria in women. In this piece, Steen has shown the charcoal burner outside of the wooden foot warmer. This choice is Steen's reference to the nature of uterus during a hysterical fit; being displaced in the body, not located where it should be. Dixon notes that the viewers visibility of the hot coals symbolizes the unquenched passion of the lovesick woman, whose womb has wandered due to abstinence.

== Inspiration ==
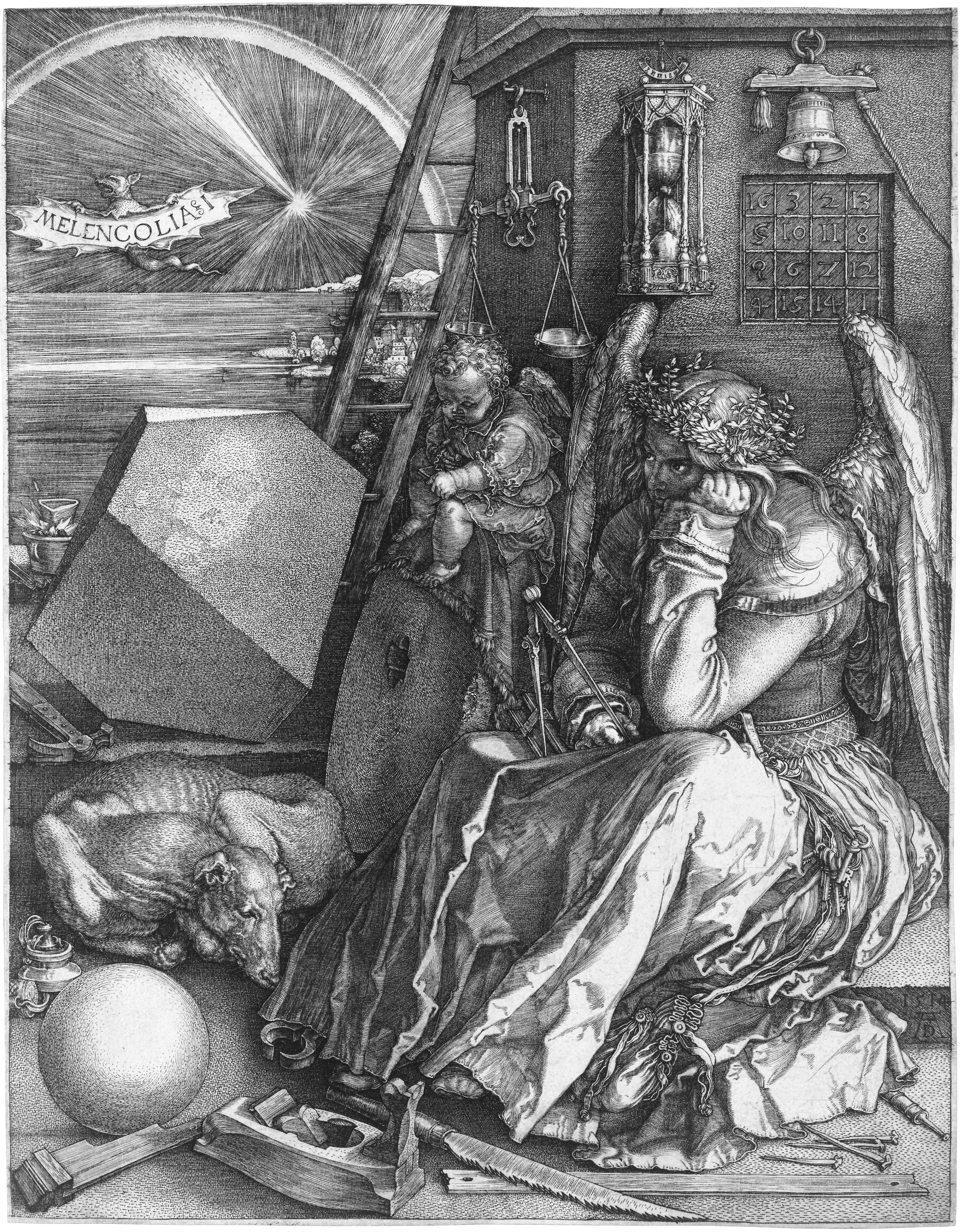
Melancholia I

Apart from the humorous genre popular at the time, Melencolia I, an engraving by Albrecht Dürer from 1514 is thought to be a source of Inspiration for the composition and visual elements of Steen's creation of The Lovesick Maiden.^{[4]} Melencolia I depicts the personification of one of the four humors: Melancholy. Melancholy was believed in the medieval period to be the worst of the four humors but such thinking changed into a more positive outlook when it was rebranded during Renaissance times to insinuate genius traits in an artist. ^{[4]}Steen, however, unlike Durer, seems to be using melancholy in the traditional sense; depicting the maiden with a melancholic expression. The inspiration and similarities between Melencolia I and The Lovesick Maiden can be understood by examining the composition of the engraving; A woman whose face has been cast with a look of gloom, leaning on one arm, and the inclusion of both the cupid statue and a sleeping dog nearby^{[10]}.

== Historical Context ==
Jan Steen attended Leiden University which was known during his lifetime for producing renowned physicians, such as Dr. Nicolaes Tulp. In the Netherlands at that time the concept of a "hospital" did not exist yet and most educated physicians received patients in their homes and only called on their patients rarely. In emergency cases, they would attend to patients in their care, but in general, people in need desiring a home visit, and those without a personal physician were left to the services of the many specialized barber-surgeons or travelling quacks. Pregnant women or women in childbirth were generally seen by midwives, not doctors. Archival studies have shown that this specific genre in painting was quite popular among art collectors of the 17th-century and it has been assumed that many 17th-century purchasers were doctors educated in Leiden who enjoyed this specific joke.

This painting came into the collection via the Helen Swift Neilson bequest in 1945. Other versions by Jan Steen are:

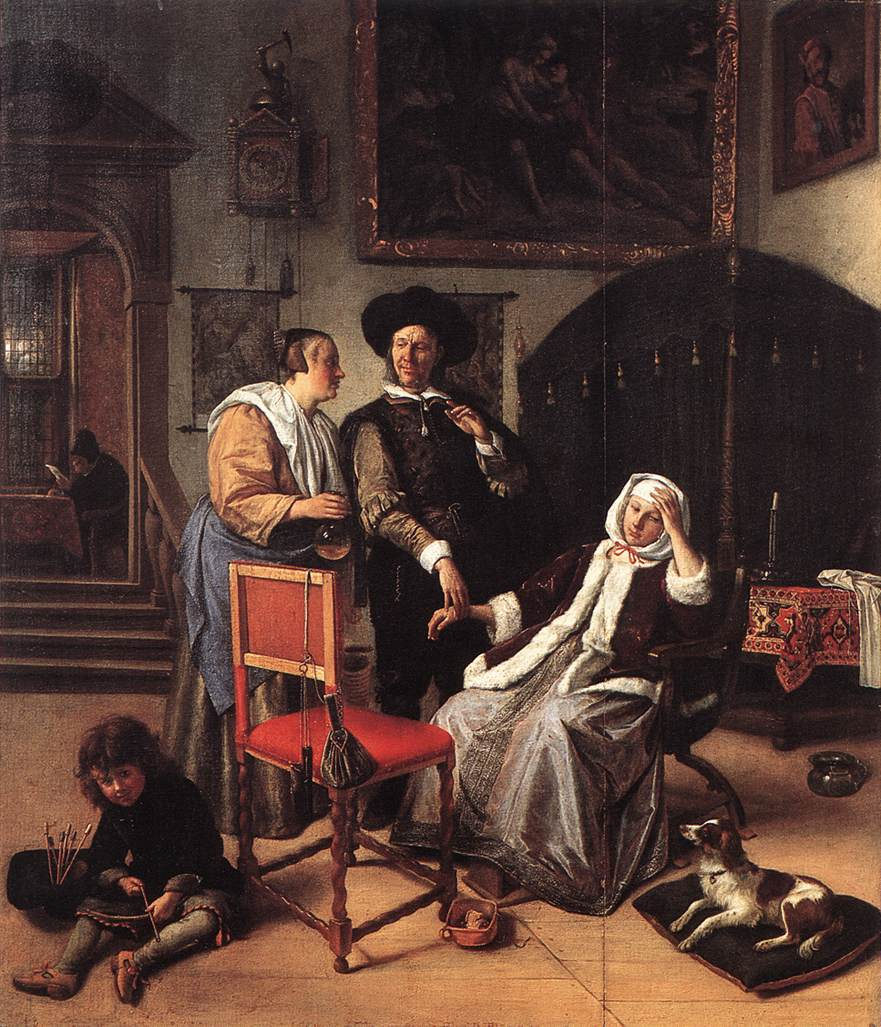
Version including a painting of the theater figure Peeckelharing, while the boy represents Cupid (Wellington Collection)

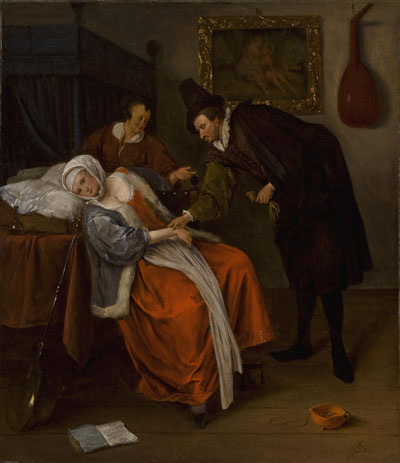
Version including a verse on the floor 'Daer baet geen Medesyn, Want het is Minnepyn'

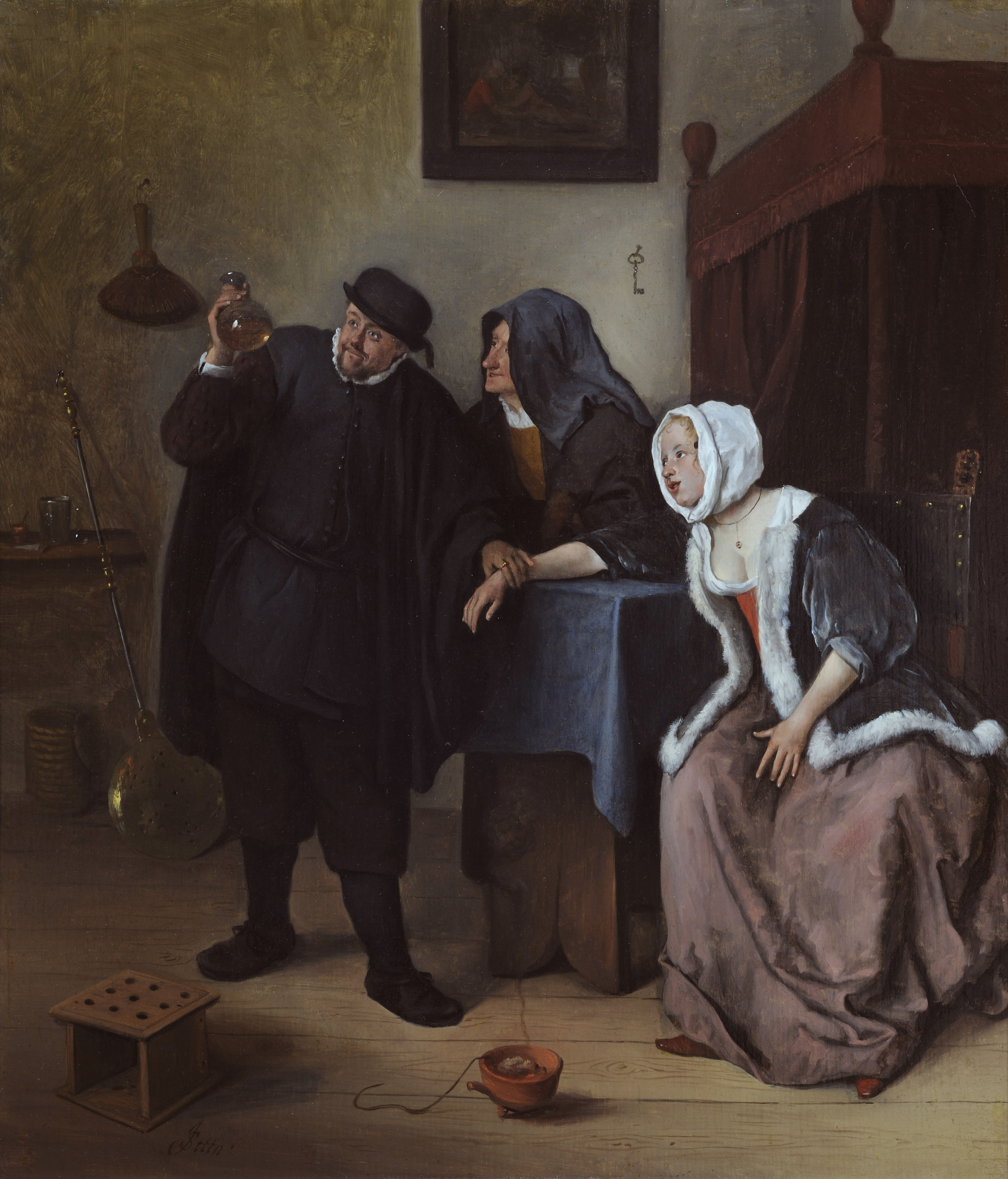
Version with the "key" next to the bed

== Sources ==
- Cat. no. 195 in Dutch Paintings in the Metropolitan Museum of Art Volume I, by Walter Liedtke, Metropolitan Museum of Art, 2007
