= List of paintings by James Ensor =

Paintings by the Belgian painter James Ensor (1860–1949) include:

Image	Title	Technique	Dimensions (cm)	Year	Collection	Ref
	Bathing Hut	oil on card	18 x 23	1876	Royal Museum of Fine Arts Antwerp	
	La Plaine flamande vue des dunes	oil on card	23.5 x 31.5	1876	private collection	
	Girl with the Upturned Nose	Oil on canvas mounted on wood	54 × 45	1879	Royal Museum of Fine Arts Antwerp	
	Portrait of the Artist at his Easel	oil on canvas	40 x 33	1879	private collection	
	Chinoiseries with Fans	oil on canvas	80 x 100	1880	Royal Museums of Fine Arts of Belgium, Brussels	
	The Lamp Boy	oil on canvas	151.5 x 91	1880	Royal Museums of Fine Arts of Belgium, Brussels	
	Le Marais	oil on canvas	-	1880	Musée des Beaux-Arts, Tournai	
	Woman with Red Parasol	oil on canvas	51 x 37	1880	Royal Museum of Fine Arts Antwerp	
	Still Life with Duck	oil on canvas	82 x 102	1880	Musée des beaux-arts, Tournai	
	The Cabbage	oil on canvas	67.5 x 79.5	1880	Royal Museums of Fine Arts of Belgium, Brussels	
	After the Storm	oil on canvas	52.5 x 62.5	1880	Kunstmuseum aan Zee, Ostend	
	Une coloriste	oil on canvas	102 x 82	1880	Royal Museums of Fine Arts of Belgium, Brussels	
	Portrait of the Artist's Father	oil on canvas	100 x 80	1880	Royal Museums of Fine Arts of Belgium, Brussels	
	Nature morte au géranium	oil on canvas	60 x 70	c.1880	Royal Museums of Fine Arts of Belgium, Brussels	
	The Bourgeois Salon	oil on canvas	133 x 109	1881	Royal Museum of Fine Arts Antwerp	
	Étude de mer	oil on canvas	50 x 73	1881	private collection	
	La Dame sombre	oil on canvas	100 x 81	1881	Royal Museums of Fine Arts of Belgium, Brussels	
	Afternoon in Ostend	oil on canvas	108 x 133	1881	Royal Museum of Fine Arts Antwerp	
	La Dame en bleu	oil on wood	68.5 x 58.5	1881	Royal Museums of Fine Arts of Belgium, Brussels	
	Russian Music	oil on canvas	133 x 110	1881	Royal Museums of Fine Arts of Belgium, Brussels	
	Le Fiacre	oil on canvas	41.5 x 54	1880–1882	private collection	
	The Woman with the Blue Shawl	oil on canvas	74 x 59	1881	Royal Museum of Fine Arts Antwerp	
	La Rue de Flandre sous la neige	oil on canvas	41.5 x 54	1881	Fondation Socindec, Vaduz	
	The Lady in Distress	oil on canvas	100.4 x 79.7	1882	Musée d'Orsay, Paris	
	The Oyster Eater	oil on canvas	240 x 185	1882	Royal Museum of Fine Arts Antwerp	
	Portrait of the Artist's Mother	oil on canvas	100 x 80	1882	Royal Museums of Fine Arts of Belgium, Brussels	
	Les masques scandalisés	oil on canvas	135 x 112	1883	Royal Museums of Fine Arts of Belgium, Brussels	
	The Rower	oil on canvas	79 x 99	1883	Royal Museum of Fine Arts Antwerp	
	The Drunkards	oil on canvas	115 x 165	1883	Royal Museums of Fine Arts of Belgium, Brussels	
	Ensor in a Flowered Hat	oil on canvas	76.5 x 61.5	1883	Kunstmuseum aan Zee, Ostend	
	The Rooftops of Ostend	oil on canvas	149 x 207	1884	Royal Museum of Fine Arts Antwerp	
	Enfant à la poupée	oil on canvas	149 x 91	1884	Wallraf-Richartz Museum, Cologne	
	Éventails et étoffes	oil on canvas	47.5 x 55.5	1885	Kunsthaus Zurich	
	The Lighthouse at Ostend	oil on panel	62 x 75	1885	Royal Museums of Fine Arts of Belgium, Brussels	
	Skeletons Looking at Chinoiserie	oil on canvas	100 x 60	1885	Museum of Fine Arts, Ghent	
	Le Meuble hanté	oil on canvas	89 x 103	1885 – c.1890	destroyed during the Second World War	
	Les Enfants à la toilette	oil on canvas	135 x 100	1886	Museum voor Schone Kunsten Gent	
	The Tribulations of Saint Antony	oil on canvas	118 x 167.5	1887	Museum of Modern Art, New York	
	Adoration of the Shepherds	oil on wood	46.7 x 60	c.1887	Royal Museums of Fine Arts of Belgium, Brussels	
	Masks Confronting Death	oil on canvas	81.3 x 100.3	1888	Museum of Modern Art, New York	
	Astonishment of the Wouze Mask	oil on canvas	109 x 131.5	1889	Royal Museum of Fine Arts Antwerp	
	Fall of the Rebel Angels	oil on canvas	108 x 132	1889	Royal Museum of Fine Arts Antwerp	
	Skeletons Warming Themselves	oil on canvas	74.8 x 60	1889	Kimbell Art Museum, Fort Worth	
	Attributs d'atelier Image © Ad Meskens / Wikimedia Commons	oil on canvas	83 x 113	1889	Neue Pinakothek, Munich	
	Christ's Entry into Brussels in 1889	oil on canvas	252.5 x 430.5	1888–1889	J. Paul Getty Museum, Los Angeles	
	Old Lady with Masks	oil on canvas	54 x 47.5	1889	Museum of Fine Arts, Ghent	
	La Tour de Lisseweghe	oil on canvas	61 x 73	1890	Fondation Socindec, Vaduz	
	The Intrigue	oil on canvas	89.5 x 149	1890	Royal Museum of Fine Arts Antwerp	
	Ensor at the Easel	oil on canvas	59.5 x 41	1890	Royal Museum of Fine Arts Antwerp	
	Les bains à Ostende	Craie noire, crayon de couleur et oil on panel	37.5 x 45.5	1890	private collection	
	Musique dans la rue de Flandre	oil on canvas	24 x 19	1891	Royal Museum of Fine Arts Antwerp	
	Skeletons Fighting over a Hanged Man	oil on canvas	59 x 74	1891	Royal Museum of Fine Arts Antwerp	
	Skeletons Fighting over a Pickled Herring	oil on panel	16 x 21	1891	Royal Museums of Fine Arts of Belgium, Brussels	
	The Good Judges	oil on panel	38 x 46	1891	private collection	
	Les Chanteurs grotesques	oil on panel	16 x 21	1891	private collection	
	Ecce homo (le Christ et les critiques)	oil on panel	12 x16	1891	private collection	
	The Man of Sorrows	oil on panel	21.5 x 16	1892	Royal Museum of Fine Arts Antwerp	
	The Ray	oil on panel	80 x 100	1892	Royal Museums of Fine Arts of Belgium, Brussels	
	Les Masques singuliers	oil on canvas	100 x 80	1892	Royal Museums of Fine Arts of Belgium, Brussels	
	The Bad Doctors	oil on panel	50 x 61	1892	Université libre de Bruxelles	
	La Vierge consolatrice	oil on panel	40 x 38	1892	private collection	
	Pierrot in Despair	oil on canvas	144.5 x 194.5	1892	Kröller-Müller Museum	
	The Savoy Cabbage	oil on canvas	81 x 100	1894	Museum Folkwang, Essen	
	The Dead Cockerel	oil on canvas	80 x 100	1894	Kunsthalle Mannheim	
	The Dangerous Cooks	oil on panel	38 x46	1896	private collection	
	Les Cuirassiers à Waterloo				Royal Museum of Fine Arts Antwerp	
	Death and the Masks	oil on canvas	78.5 x 100	1897	Musée des beaux-arts, Liège	
	Ensor aux masques	oil on canvas	120 x 80	1899	private collection	
	Au Conservatoire	Oil on canvas mounted on wood	56.5 x 71.5	1902	Musée d'Orsay, Paris	
	Personages devant l'affiche de "La gamme d'amour"	oil on canvas	86.5 x 71	1914	Royal Museums of Fine Arts of Belgium, Brussels	
	Carnival in Flanders	oil on panel	27 x 36	after 1920	Kunsthaus Zurich	
	Still Life with Cabbage	oil on canvas	72 x 102	1921	Kröller-Müller Museum, Otterlo	
