= The Rooftops of Ostend =

Painting by James Ensor

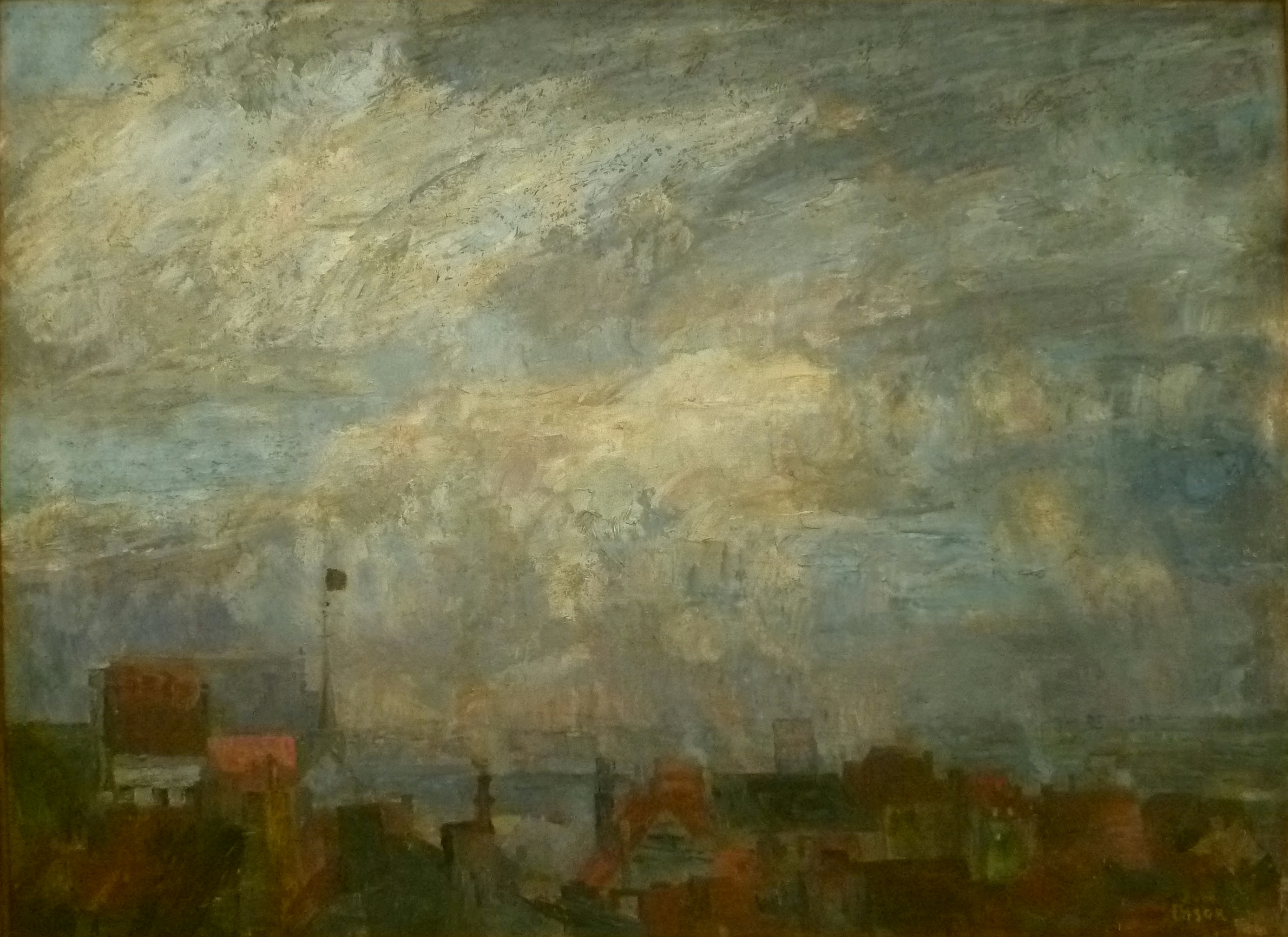
- Artist: James Ensor
- Year: 1884
- Medium: Oil on canvas
- Dimensions: 149 cm × 207 cm (59 in × 81 in)
- Location: Royal Museum of Fine Arts Antwerp; Antwerp

The Rooftops of Ostend is an oil-on-canvas painting by the Flemish expressionist painter James Ensor. This painting is on the official inventory of Flemish masterpieces. The Rooftops of Ostend is in the possession of Royal Museum of Fine Arts Antwerp.

== Background ==
Ensor painted the view of his window from his attic studio three times during his career. The artist's attic studio was located in his parental home in Ostend, Belgium. However, it is difficult to determine which parts of Ostend was depicted in this painting since the city has changed significantly from Ensor's time.

Ensor never travelled afar in search of exotic or extraordinary settings. He was mostly interested in his immediate surroundings and was able to find enough inspiration for painting in Ostend, since he was intrigued by the nearby sea as well as Ostend's townscape.

== Description ==
Storm is the main theme of the painting. The stormy clouds covering the city of Ostend attract the viewer's attention, and only a small portion of the painting depicts the roofs and the houses. Ensor's delicate use of dark colours and the scarcity of light depict a threatening landscape that suggests a near destruction for the city.

This portrayal of Ostend is surprising and inconsistent with Ensor's writings and notes in which he praises Ostend and his native land.

== See also ==
- List of paintings by James Ensor
