= The Man of Sorrows (Ensor) =

Painting by James Ensor

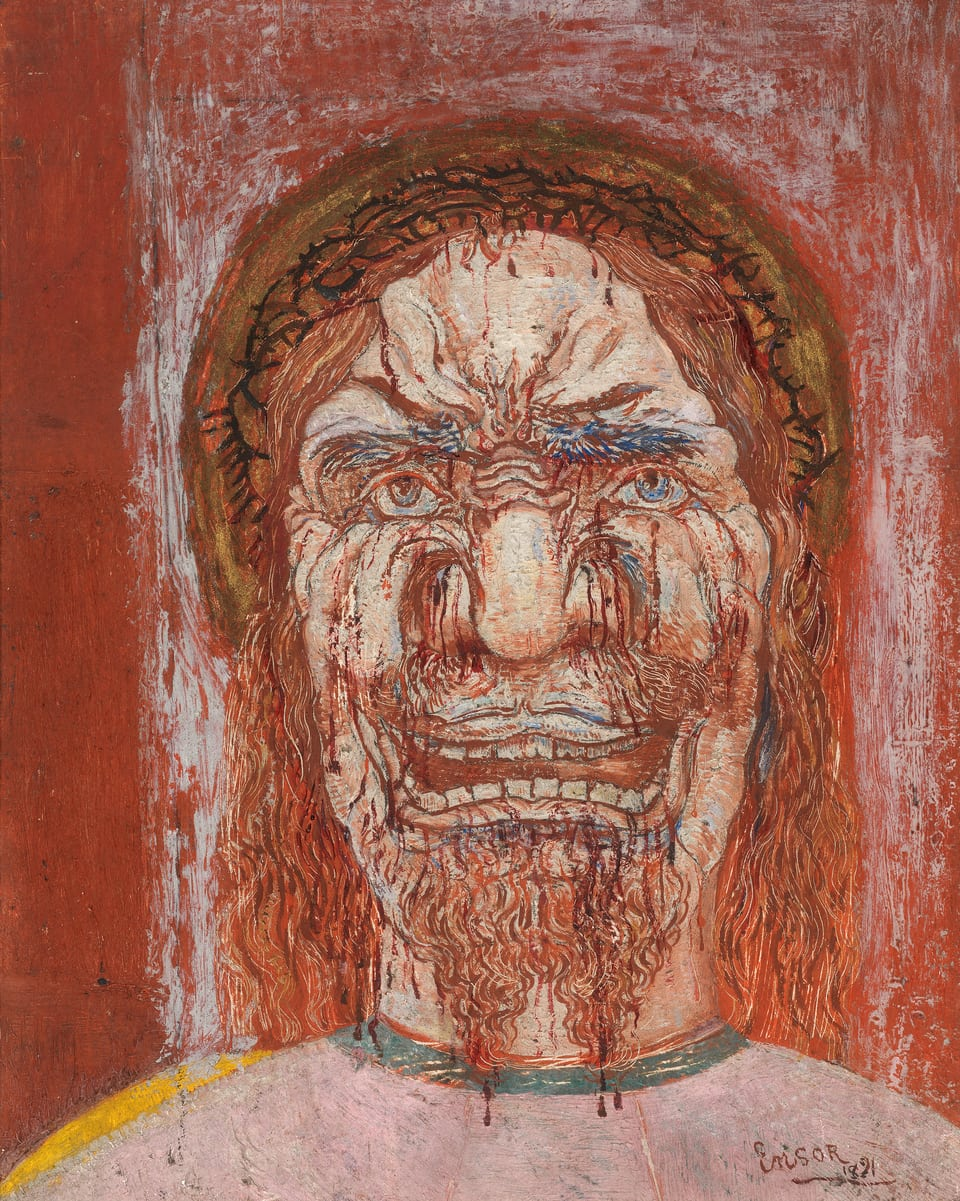
- Artist: James Ensor
- Year: 1891
- Medium: Oil on panel
- Dimensions: 20 cm × 15 cm × 4 cm (7.9 in × 5.9 in × 1.6 in)
- Location: Royal Museum of Fine Arts Antwerp, Antwerp

The Man of Sorrows is an 1891 oil painting by the Flemish expressionist painter James Ensor. This painting is enlisted on the official inventories of Flemish masterpieces and is a part of the great masters collection of the Royal Museum of Fine Arts Antwerp. The painting is based on a fifteenth-century painting by Albert Bouts of the same title.

Ensor's use of the visual elements of a demon in The Man of Sorrows and generally in his religious paintings is significant.

== Description ==
The bleeding face of Christ in combination with a devil's mask from the Japanese Noh theatre creates a horrifying combination.

Ensor's use of sharp colours add to the grotesque atmosphere of the painting.

== Interpretation ==
The Man of Sorrows is the manifestation of Ensor's identification with Christ who was also a marginal and misunderstood person. The tortured expression on the face of Christ also reflects the existential crisis that the artist went through in 1890s. During this period of his life, Ensor was deeply depressed. As a result of his depression, he tried to sell his studio and its entire contents of pictures.

Representing himself deformed and in pain with a bleeding face reflects the artist's suffering and his interpretation of literal affliction.

== Source of inspiration ==
The artist's frustration with the conformist society of his time surged in 1891. The Man of Sorrows is a turning point in Ensor's career and it shows the artist's anger and his desire for resistance.

Ensor was intrigued by Bruegel and the primitive. He called his fascination as "love for extraordinary and the abnormal". This love is reflected in The Man of Sorrows and another of his paintings, The Mystic Death of a Theologian.

== See also ==
- List of paintings by James Ensor
