= The Physician's Visit =

Painting by Jan Steen

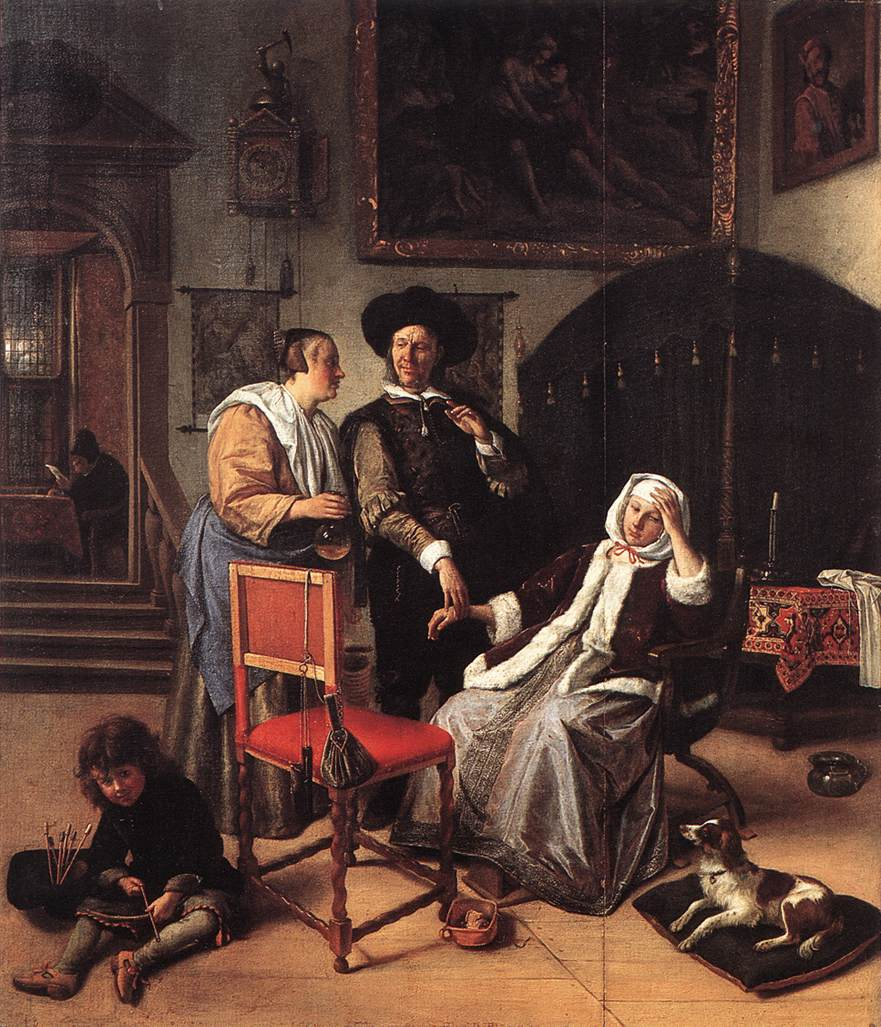

The Physician's Visit (c. 1660–1662) is an oil-on-canvas genre painting by the Dutch artist Jan Steen, now seen in the Apsley House collection in London. Its subject is similar to his The Lovesick Maiden in the Metropolitan Museum of Art from the same era. The painting is a representation of how women were treated when treated by doctors in the 1600s. The painting features several small details and disguised symbolism that may go unnoticed to the common eye, but nevertheless contribute to the painting's meaning.

== Visual analysis ==
This painting is a visual representation of medical practices that were performed on women in the 1660s. Jan Steen uses very direct facial expressions to show what the people in this painting were feeling. Women in paintings such as this and The Lovesick Maiden are usually young, pretty and well dressed, while being positioned upward in a chair. The facial expressions in these paintings often had a vacant and senseless look while the doctor takes the woman's pulse. In other similar examples, the doctor may also be looking at the urine sample that an assistant holds up to the light. The backgrounds of these paintings tend to have elegant paintings on the walls. The woman sitting down on the right is suffering from illness, which during the time was not only hard to identify, but also extremely difficult to treat. Paintings consistently represent women in a fragile, passive, housebound way which was much more of a male wish, rather than a female reality. Women in these paintings are often presented to be weak, and surrounded by concerned family members.

== Historical background ==
A connection between art and medicine that is represented in these paintings has sometimes gone unrecognized. The themes that are represented in medical paintings are often created by the artist in regards to ancient medical theories that were still believed in during the seventeenth century. Contemporary medical information was referenced in the paintings by Dutch painters and their patrons in the 1600s, who may or may not have had access to medical knowledge in other languages. The paintings typically represent the practice of medicine by using a formulaic combination of characters and props: a distressed woman, a chair, a pan of urine, and a doctor's assistant.
