= Christ's Entry Into Brussels in 1889 =

Painting by James Ensor

- L'Entrée du Christ à Bruxelles (French)
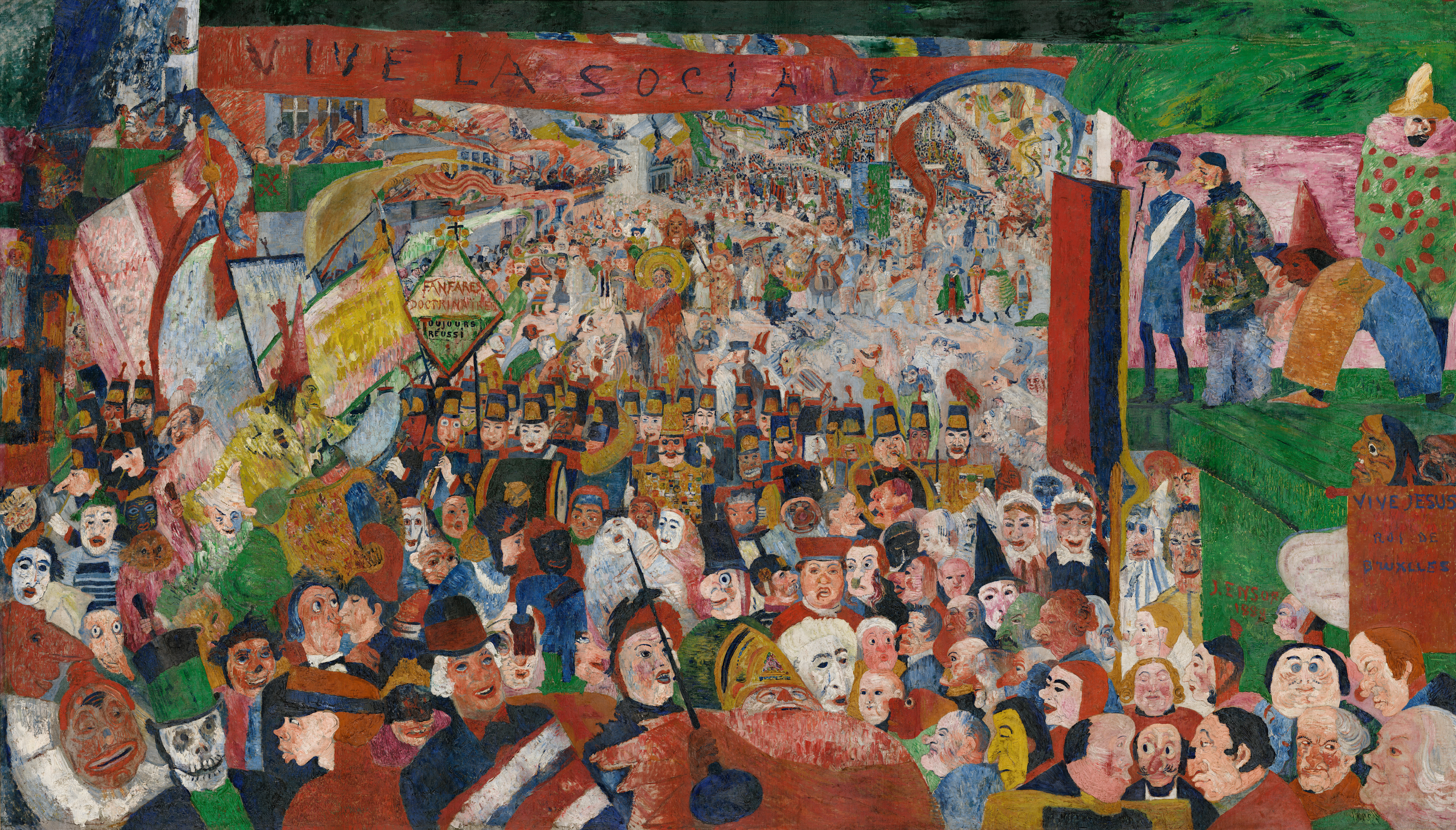
- Artist: James Ensor
- Year: 1888
- Medium: Oil on canvas
- Dimensions: 252.6 cm × 431 cm (99.4 in × 170 in)
- Location: Getty Center, Los Angeles

Christ's Entry Into Brussels in 1889 (French: L'Entrée du Christ à Bruxelles, "Entry of Christ into Brussels") is an 1888 painting by the Belgian artist James Ensor. The post-Impressionist work, parodying Jesus' triumphal entry into Jerusalem celebrated on Palm Sunday, is considered Ensor's most famous composition and a precursor to Expressionism. It has been held by the Getty Center in Los Angeles since 1987.

== Description ==
The monumental work measures 2.53 m × 4.31 m (8 ft 4 in × 14 ft 2 in). It was so large that Ensor was unable to work on the whole painting at the same time, nailing part to the walls and allowing the rest to drape on the ground. He used brushes, palette knives and spatulas, laying on paint thickly, mostly as pure pigments. It was painted on a single piece of linen canvas, primed with lead white and with extensive underdrawing in various colours, some visible, and very few pentimenti. Some parts may be considered a coloured drawing, with Ensor colouring up to but not over the lines of his underdrawing.

It depicts a crowded scene with a colourful carnival procession, ostensibly held to celebrate the arrival of Christ, but none of the surrounding figures pay any attention to the small figure of Christ – almost hidden at the centre, with yellow halo and red coat, riding on a donkey, with one hand raised in greeting or blessing – amid the grotesque clowns, a marching band, and other figures, many apparently wearing masks. Above is a red banner, with the words "Vive la sociale". To the right, another banner reads "Vive Jesus Roi de Bruxlles" beside the painters signature "J. Ensor" and the date, 1888. Some of the figures may be caricatures of real figures: for example, Christ resembles Ensor himself, and one figure has been identified as the Marquis de Sade.

== History ==
Detail showing Christ

The painting was rejected by Les XX, and kept in the artist's house in Ostend, although it was shown at his studio in his lifetime.

It was first exhibited in 1929 at the Centre for Fine Arts, Brussels. It was damaged by shrapnel during the Second World War, including the Death figure to the lower left with the skull mask, and acquired by the banker Louis Franck after Ensor's death in 1949. It was wax lined and varnished in the early 1950s. It was exhibited on loan at the Royal Museum of Fine Arts, Antwerp from 1947 to 1983, then the Kunsthaus Zürich from 1983 to 1987. It was shown at a retrospective in 1976 at the Art Institute of Chicago, and Guggenheim Museum.

Franck sold the work to the Getty Museum in 1987, for €9 million. Despite protests in Belgium, the painting was exported, and it is on permanent exhibition at the Getty Center in Los Angeles.

In their initial conservation work, the Getty removed the discoloured 1950s varnish, and left the cleaned painting unvarnished, as Ensor had left it. The 1950s lining and its deteriorated wax resin adhesive were also removed, and the work was relined to and mounted on a new aluminium stretcher. The gilding was removed from the simple frame, which was returned to its original white colour.

The Getty also holds a graphite and Conté crayon sketch, from 1885. Ensor also made an etching in 1898, which shows some details, such as the inscriptions on banners, which appear to have been painted out by Ensor in the prime work.

The painting is one of just three selected by Stefan Jonsson to explain the history of democracy and socialism over a period of two centuries, and how "the masses" are perceived.

== See also ==
- List of paintings by James Ensor
