= Moroder =

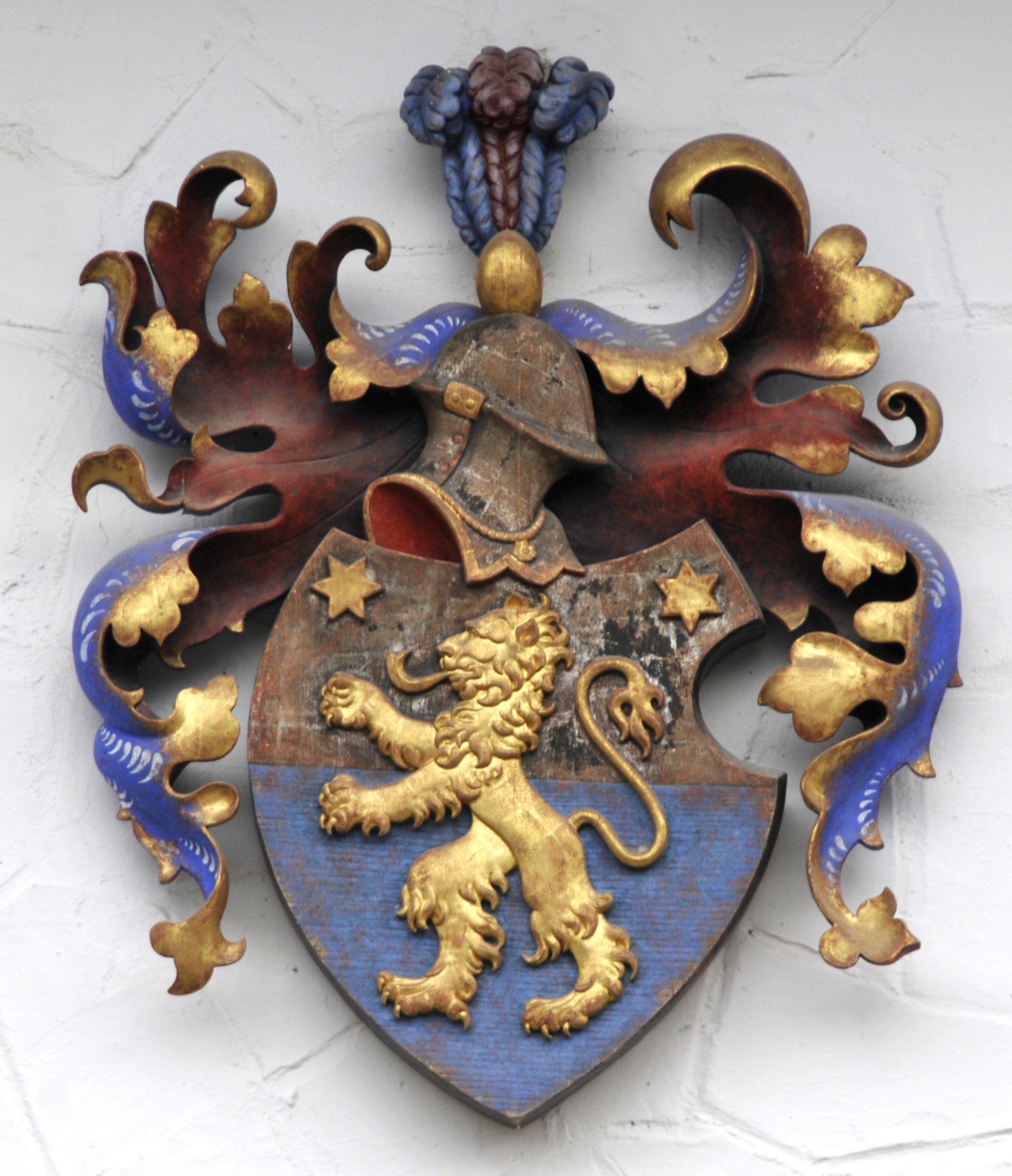
Moroder's household crest

Moroder (German pronunciation: [mɔˈʁoːdɐ]) is a germanised version of the Ladin surname Mureda.

Originally a surname from Val Gardena, South Tyrol (present almost exclusively in Ortisei), since the 18th century traders migrating from Val Gardena have also distributed the surname elsewhere in Italy (Bolzano, Ancona, Pordenone) and abroad in Valencia and Lyon, and subsequently in Austria, Germany, Santiago de Chile, and the United States.

The Moroders of Ortisei, of which there are several branches distinct from the "farm" or "house of origin" (Costamula, Lenert, Lusenberg, Resciesa, Doss, Cialian), are traditionally known as a family of wood carvers.

Notable people with the name include:

== People ==
- Adele Moroder (1887–1966), Austrian author
- Albin Moroder (1922–2007), Austrian sculptor
- Alex Moroder (1923–2006), Italian activist
- Daniel Moroder (born 2002), ski jumper
- David Moroder (1931–1997), Italian luger and woodcarver
- Egon Rusina Moroder (born 1949) Italian painter and illustrator
- Franz Moroder (1847–1920), Austrian politician and poet
- Friedrich (Rico) Moroder (1880–1937), Austrian sculptor
- Giorgio Moroder (born 1940), Italian musician
- Luis Moroder (1940–2024), Chemist
- Josef Moroder-Lusenberg (1846–1939), Austrian-Italian painter and sculptor
- Johann Baptist Moroder (1870–1932), Austrian sculptor
- Ludwig Moroder "Lenert" (1879–1953), Italian sculptor and teacher
- Karin Moroder (born 1974), Italian cross-country skier, Olympic bronze medal winner
- Otto Moroder (1894–1977), Austrian sculptor
- Petra Moroder (born 1968), Italian freestyle skier
- Rudolf Moroder-Lenèrt (1877–1914), Tyrolean religious artist
- Ulrich Moroder (born 1948), South Tyrolean artist
- Walter Moroder (born 1963), South Tyrolean sculptor

== See also ==
- Moroder family official website
- Cizeta-Moroder V16T, an Italian sports car 1991–95
