= Neururer =

Neururer is a surname. Notable people with the surname include:

- Agnes Neururer, Austrian luger
- Heidi Neururer (born 1979), Austrian snowboarder
- Otto Neururer (1882–1940), Austrian Catholic priest
- Peter Neururer (born 1955), German football manager
