= FIL World Luge Championships 1959 =

The FIL World Luge Championships 1959 took place in Villard-de-Lans, France. The men's doubles event was cancelled to poor weather conditions. It was the first time an event has been entirely cancelled in the history of the World Championships, European Championships, or Winter Olympics, but its happened again at the World Championships 2011.

== Men's singles ==
Medal	Athlete	Time
Gold	Herbert Thaler (AUT)	
Silver	Josef Feistmantl (AUT)	
Bronze	David Moroder (ITA)	

== Women's singles ==
Medal	Athlete	Time
Gold	Elly Lieber (AUT)	
Silver	Maria Isser (AUT)	
Bronze	Agnes Neururer (AUT)	

== Men's doubles ==
The event was cancelled due to weather conditions.

== Medal table ==
Rank	Nation	Gold	Silver	Bronze	Total
1	Austria (AUT)	2	2	1	5
2	Italy (ITA)	0	0	1	1
Totals (2 entries)		2	2	2	6
