= David Moroder =

Italian luger and sculptor (1931–1997)

Medal record

Luge

World Championships
| Silver medal – second place | 1961 Girenbad | Men's doubles |
| Bronze medal – third place | 1959 Villard-de-Lans | Men's singles |

David Moroder (28 January 1931 in Ortisei in Val Gardena – 10 March 1997) was an Italian luger and sculptor.

== Biography ==
David Moroder comes from the Grödner craftsman family of Moroder. He has four sons, including Walter Moroder, who works as a sculptor using modern materials. As a sculptor he worked with wood and bronze. He received artistic impulses from his brother Rudolf Moroder and from Augusto Murer. He had private and public clients and participated in various exhibitions in the region.

== Sporting career ==
Moroder was active as a luge athlete. He was third in the single-seater in 1959 at the Luge World Championships in Villard -de-Lans and in 1961 together with Raimondo Prinoth second in the doubles at the World Championships in Girenbad. Who competed from the late 1950s to the early 1960s. He won two medals at the FIL World Luge Championships with a silver in the men's doubles event (1961) and a bronze in the men's singles event (1959).
