= Elly Lieber =

Austrian luger (1932–2020)

Medal record

Luge

World Championships
Gold medal – first place	1959 Villard-de-Lans	Women's singles

European Championships
Gold medal – first place	1956 Imst	Women's singles

Elly Lieber (7 October 1932 in Aussee – 1 August 2020 in Bad Aussee) was an Austrian luger who competed in the late 1950s. She won the gold medal in the women's singles event at the 1959 FIL World Luge Championships in Villard-de-Lans, France.

Lieber also won a gold medal in the women's singles event at the 1956 European luge championships in Imst, Austria.
