= Josef Moroder-Lusenberg =

Italian sculptor

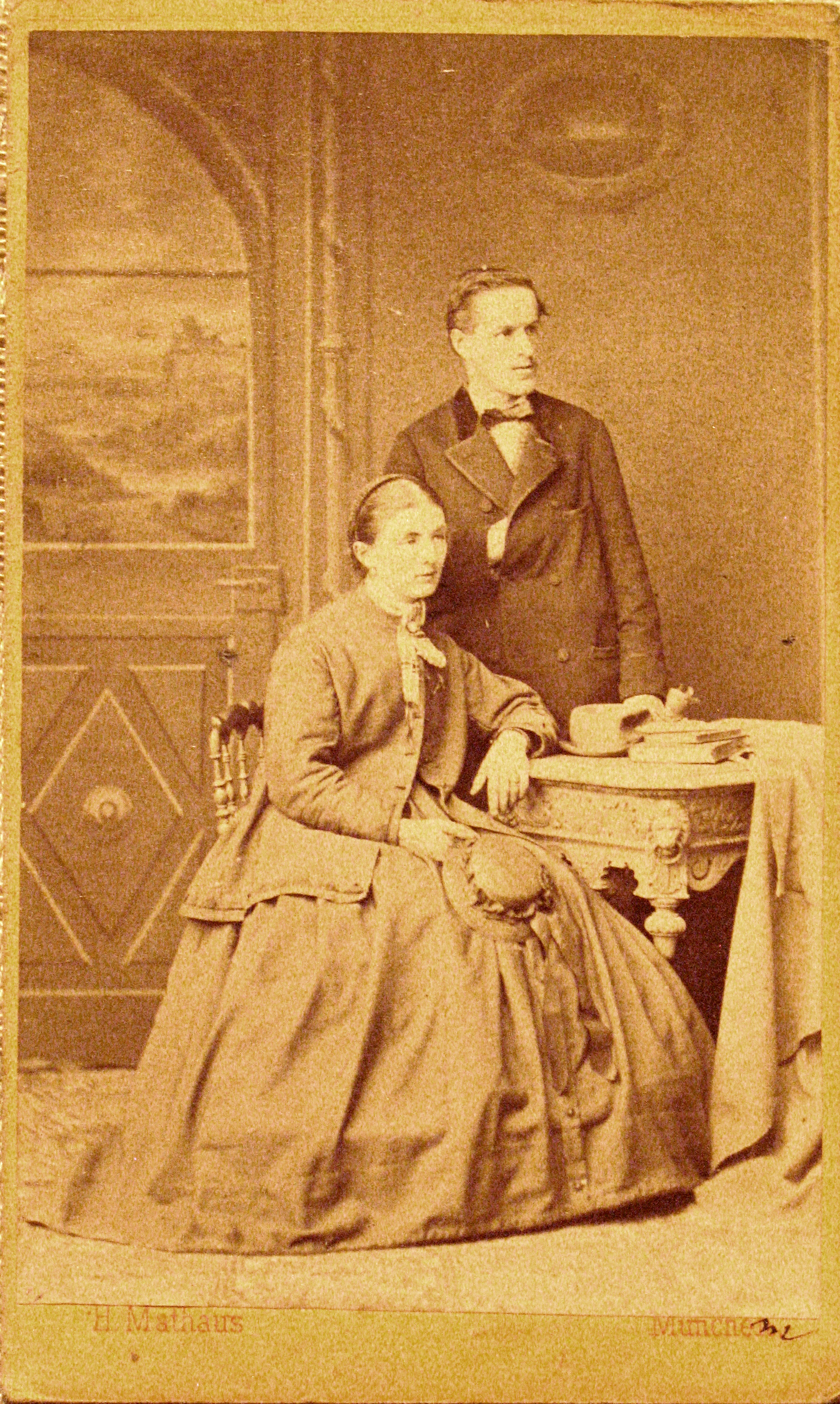
- Josef Moroder Lusenberg and wife Annamaria Sanoner
- Born: Josef Moroder; 28 May 1846; Urtijëi
- Died: 16 February 1939 (aged 92); Urtijëi
- Education: Academy of Fine Arts Munich
- Known for: painting, sculpture
- Movement: Munich School

Josef Theodor Moroder, also known as the Lusenberger, (28 May 1846 in Urtijëi – 16 February 1939 in Urtijëi) was a painter and sculptor, the most prominent artist of the Moroder family from the Grödenthal in South Tyrol (now the Val Gardena in Italy).

== Biography ==
Josef, the fourth of eight children, lost his father when he was eight years old. He was apprenticed in a woodcarving studio under Franz Prinoth, an academic sculptor educated in the Munich Academy, and in his twenties, Josef started his own studio. Examples of his early activity as a sculptor are the statues of the Maria Addolorata and of the Virgin Mary in the Parish Church of Urtijëi.

His first wife, Annamaria Sanoner died after she gave birth to their fourth child in 1874. He married Felizitas Unterplatzer who gave birth to eleven other children. She also took care of his farm and was active as an antiquarian. Thirty years old, with the support of Felizitas, he visited the Academy of Munich (1876–1880) to learn the art of painting after he was impressed in Vienna by the genre painting of Franz von Defregger, The Dance in the Mountains. His teachers in Munich were Joseph Knabl, Ludwig von Löfftz and Feodor Dietz. From 1880 to 1884 he was a pupil of Defregger; becoming close friends, they took many painting trips through the villages of the Trentino.

In Munich Josef Moroder was influenced by the genre and historical painting of Defregger and the realistic-idealistic painting movement of Wilhelm Leibl. From his numerous sketch books we can see how precisely he observed nature, landscape and specially the Tyrolean and alpine lifestyle in Val Gardena. Many of his paintings, watercolours and sketches of farmhouses, huts, people and portraits are a testimony of a lost alpine world which once was the 19th-century Tyrol.

The populist-romantic novelist Maria Veronika Rubatscher was well acquainted with the artist and wrote his biography in 1930, which became a popular novel.

One of his pupils was Ludwig Moroder-Lenert. Most of Josef's children, Johann Baptist, Friedrich (Rico), Alfons, Josef, Otto, Hermann, became valid sculptors. His son Alfons (1882–1960) settled in Milwaukee where he set up a business to sell altars for churches and statues of saints partially produced by him or imported from his native village, Urtijëi.

== Exhibitions ==
- A major exhibition was held in Innsbruck in 1973.
- Josef Moroder's watercolours were shown in Bolzano Italy in 1985.
- In 2009 two exhibitions in Urtijëi and Bolzano with respectively 120 and 100 works.
- The Museum of Val Gardena in Urtijëi exhibits more than 30 of his oil paintings and watercolours.

== Gallery ==
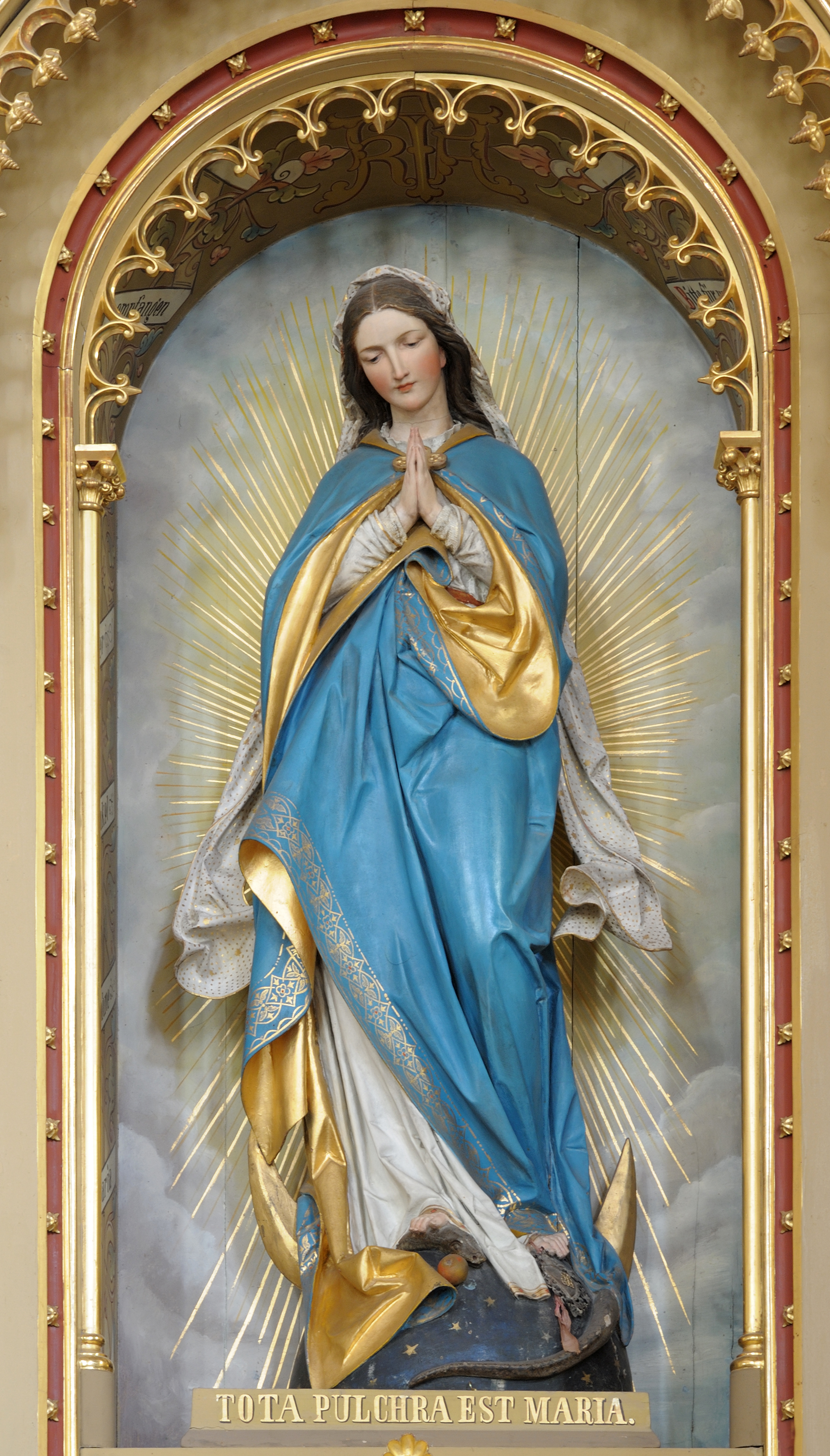
Virgin Mary in the parish church of Urtijëi by Josef Moroder-Lusenberg.

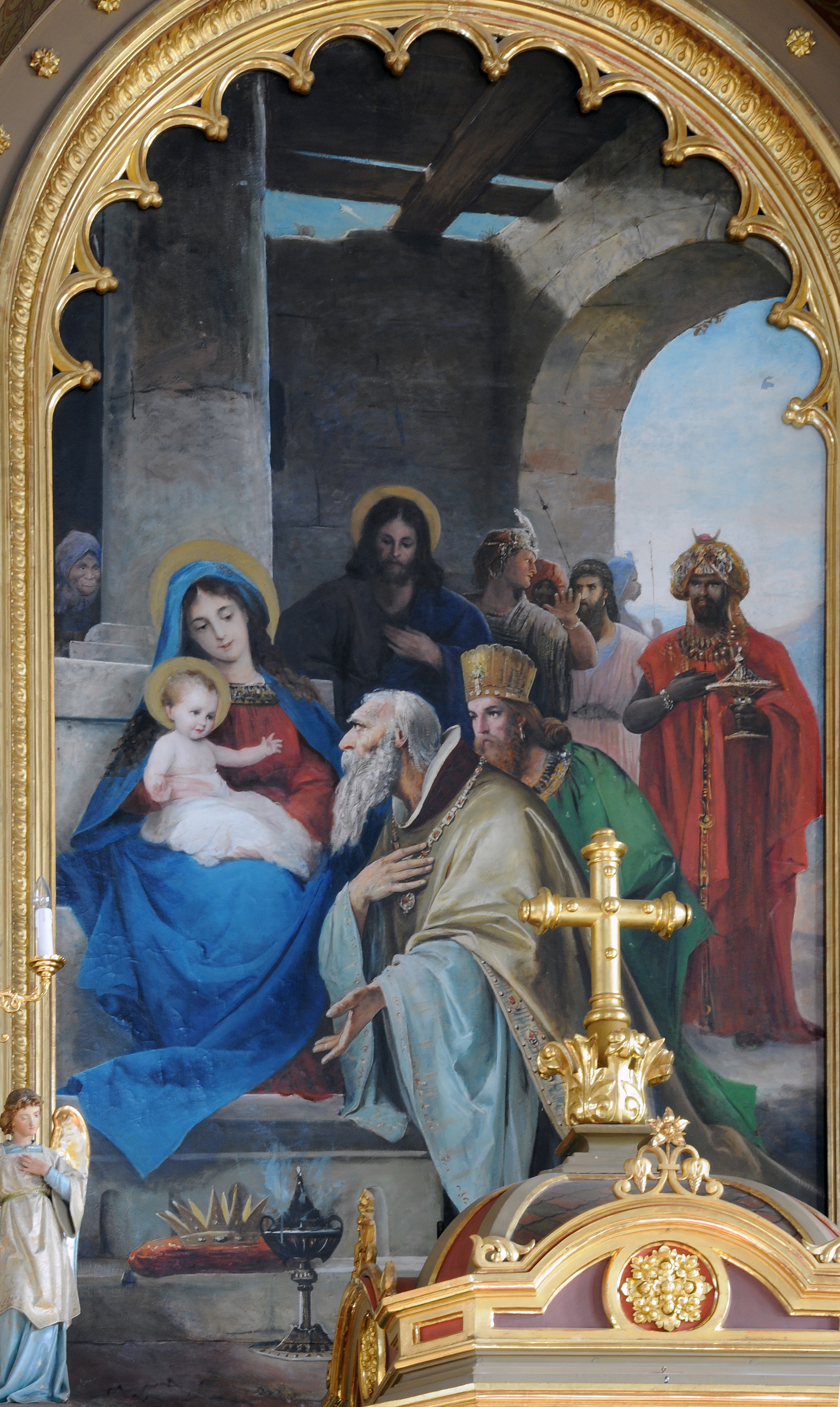
Adoration of the Magi in the parish church of Urtijëi by Josef Moroder-Lusenberg.

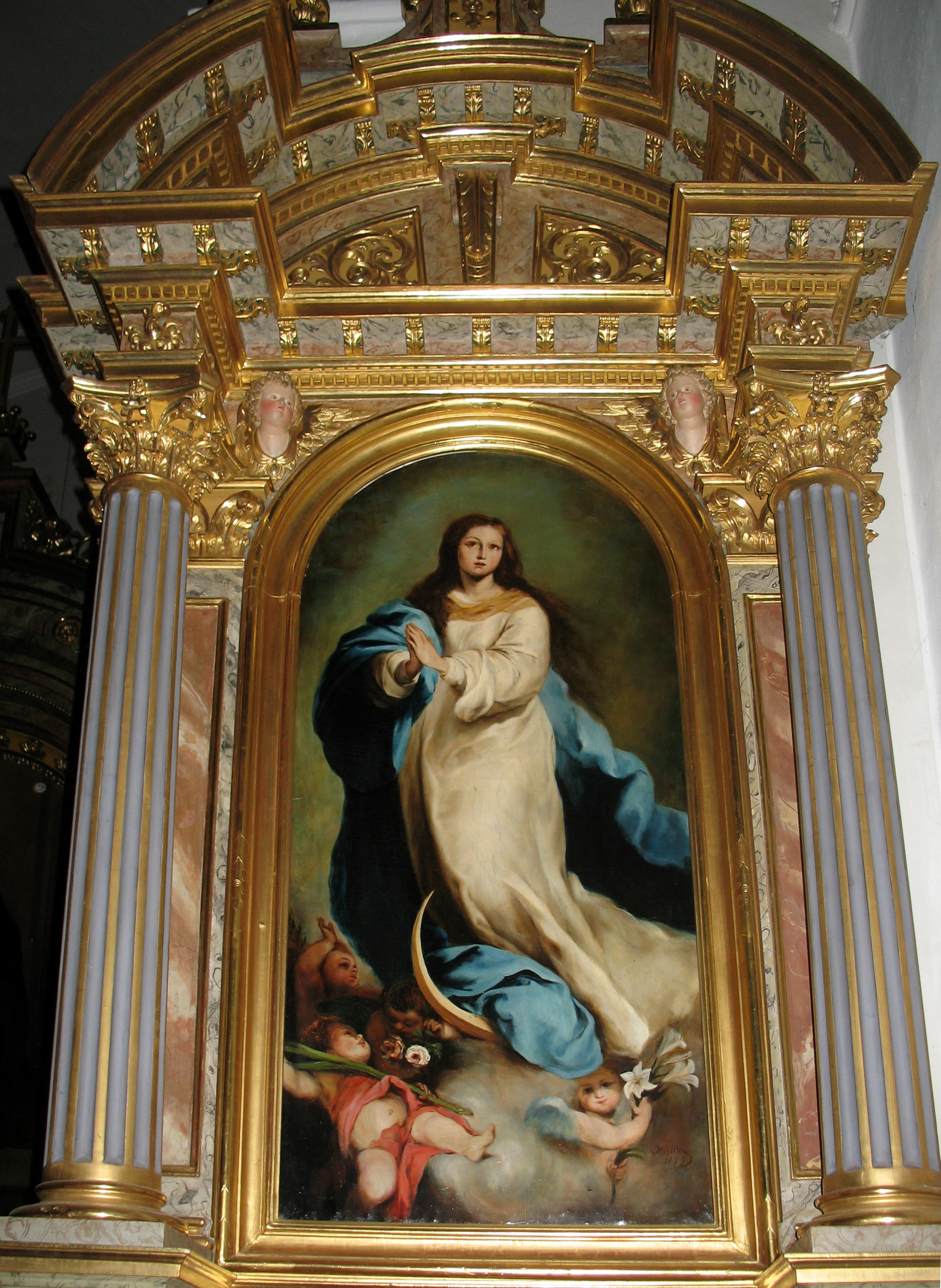
Maria Immaculata, painting after Murillo, in the S. Antony church, by Josef Moroder-Lusenberg, 1876.

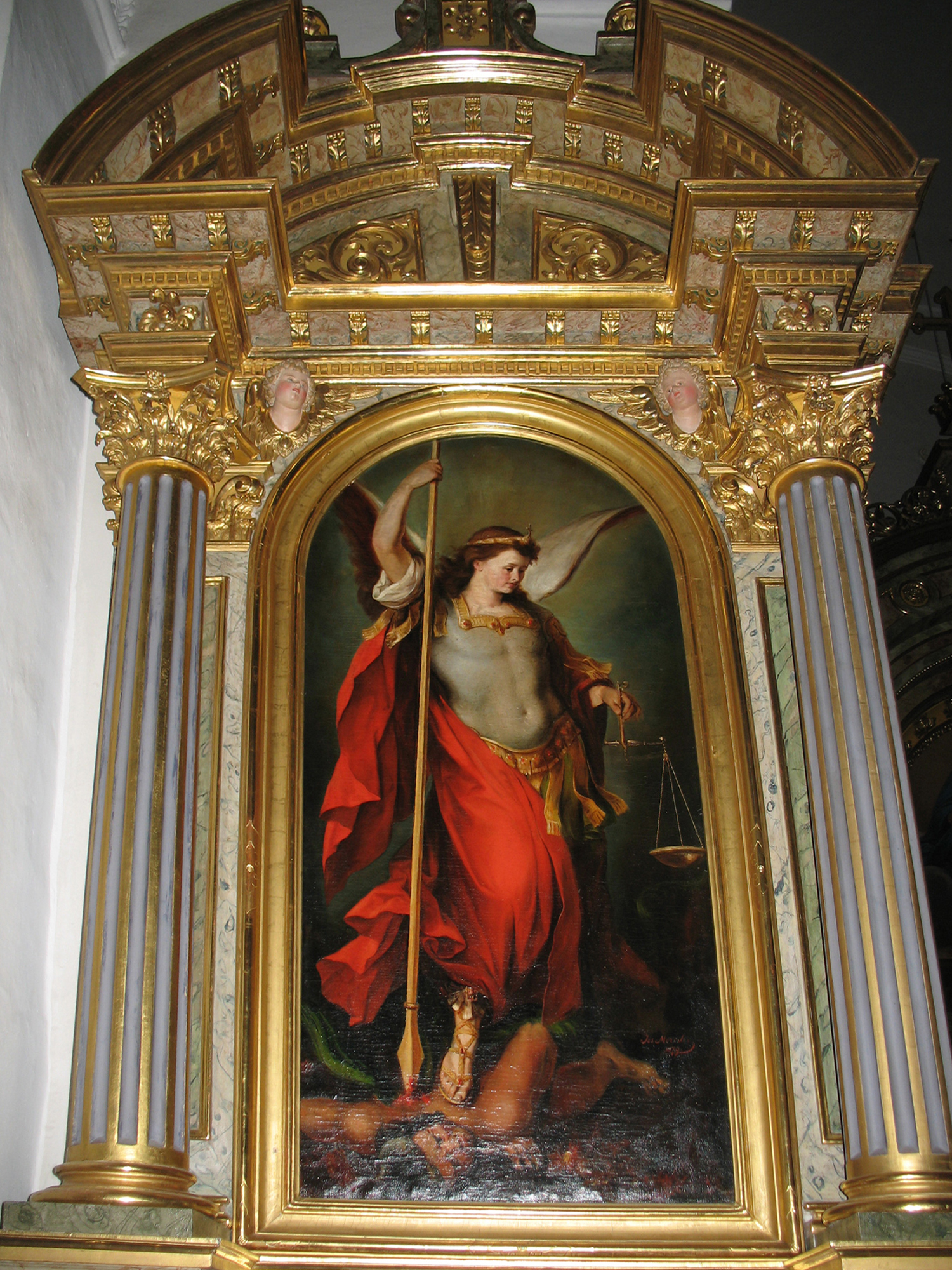
Archangel Michael in the S. Antony church by Josef Moroder-Lusenberg, 1876.

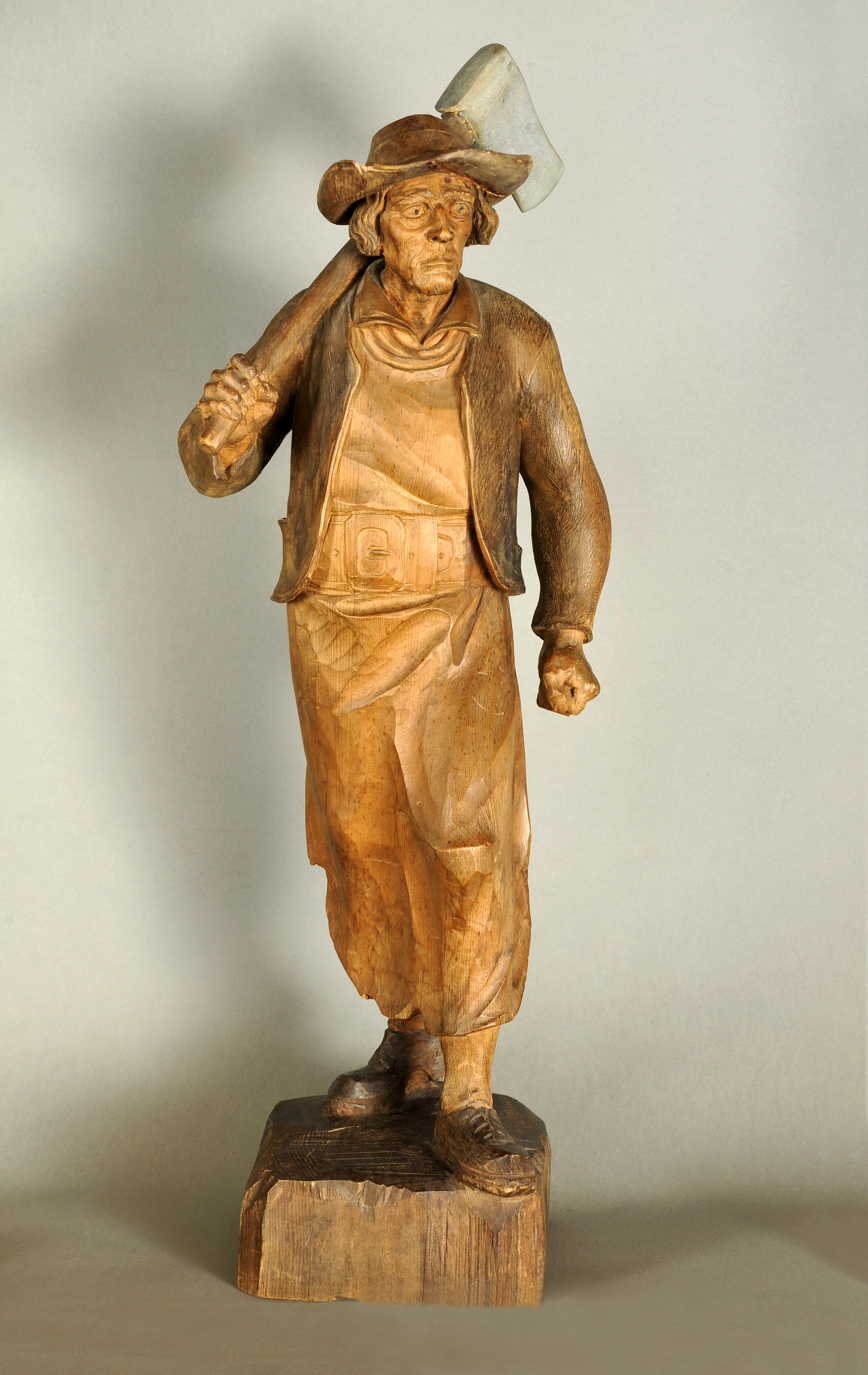
Lumberjack carved in Swiss pine by Josef Moroder-Lusenberg.

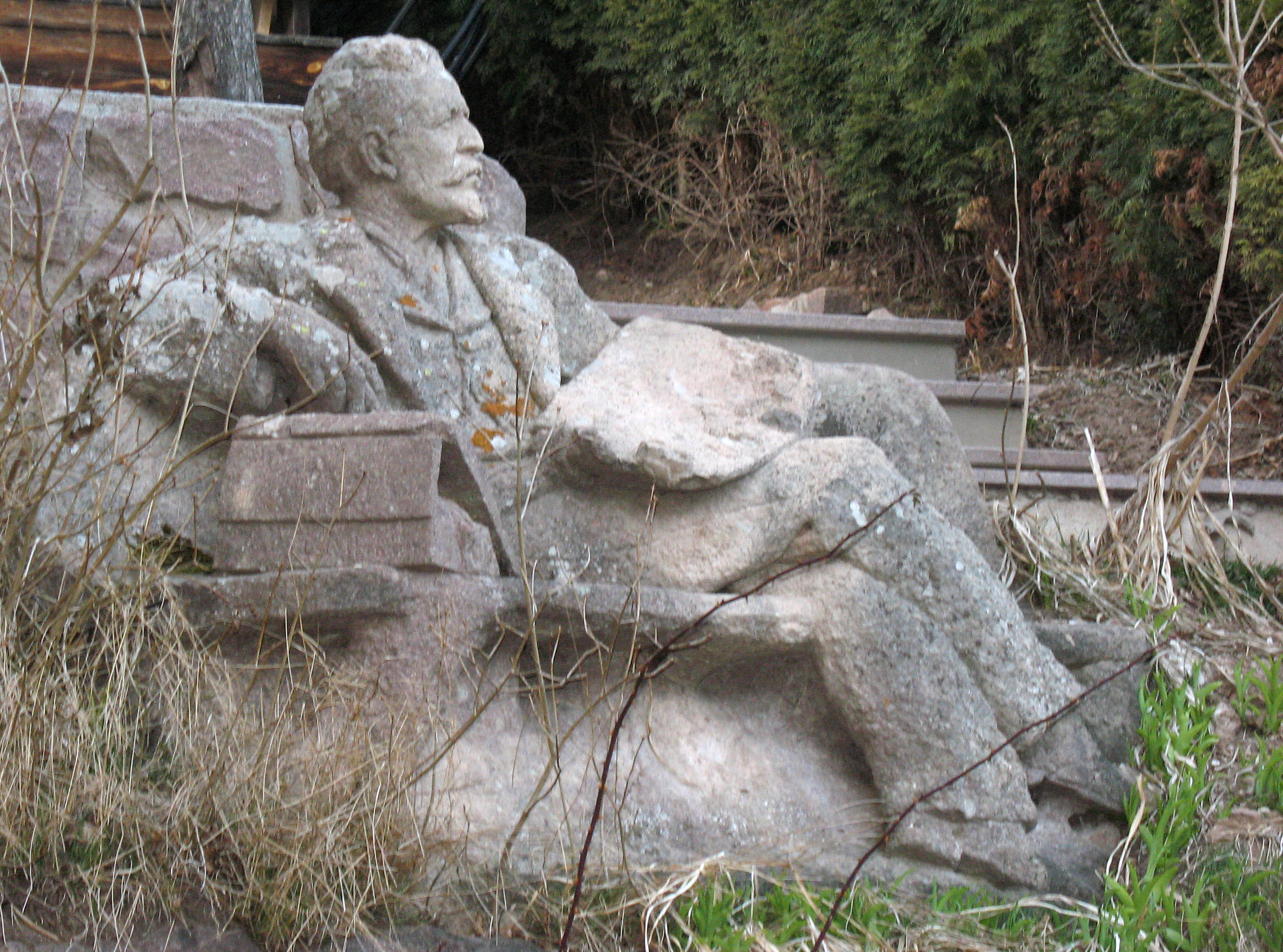
Monument to the artist by his son Johann Baptist Moroder, 1896.

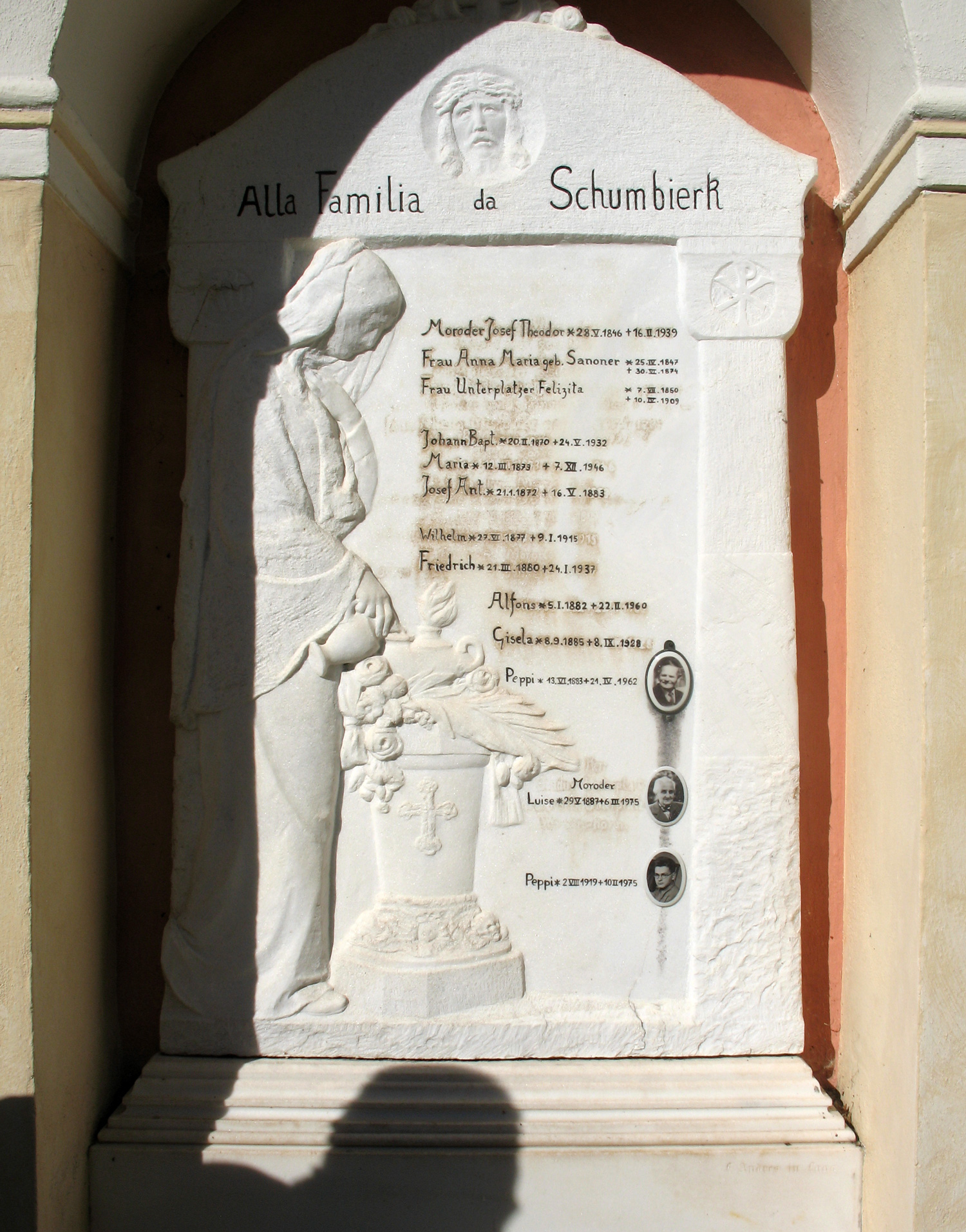
Family grave of the artist in Urtijëi by the son Johann Baptist 1928.

== Bibliography (in German) ==
- Maria Veronika Rubatscher. Der Lusenberger. Der Roman eines Künstlerlebens. München: Verlag Josef Kösel & Friedrich Pustet, 1930 (Reprint Athesia Bozen, 1980 ISBN 88-7024-384-2 or ISBN 88-7014-123-3).
- Komitee für die Drucklegung des Moroder-Stammbuches. Die Moroder, ein altladinisches Geschlecht aus Gröden-Dolomiten. Vom 14. bis zum 20. Jahrhundert. Ursprung - Geschichte - Biographien - Anhang. Beitrag zur tirolischen Familienforschung - Edited by the Moroder Book committee, Urtijëi 1980. Pages 188-204. (Book mainly in German, with some minor parts in English, Italian, Spanish and Ladin). British Library LF.31.a.1348.
- Sybille-Karin Moser. Tiroler Bilder und Ihre Darstellung. Malerei von 1830 bis 1900. S. 519. Aus: Kunst in Tirol. Herausgeber: Paul Naredi-Rainer, Lukas Madersbacher.Verlagsanstalt Tyrolia Innsbruck und Verlagsanstalt Athesia Bozen 2007. ISBN 978-3-7022-2776-0 - ISBN 978-88-8266-409-1.
