= Herbert Thaler =

Austrian luger (born 1940)

Medal record

Luge

World Championships
Gold medal – first place	1959 Villard-de-Lans	Men's singles
Silver medal – second place	1960 Garmisch-Partenkirchen	Men's doubles

Herbert Thaler (born 22 January 1940 in Imst) is an Austrian luger who competed from the late 1950s to the early 1960s. He won two medals at the FIL World Luge Championships with a gold in the men's singles (1959) and a silver in the men's doubles event (1960).
