= Ulrich Moroder =

Italian artist

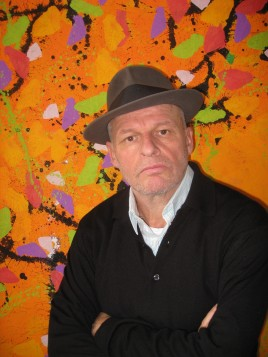
Moroder in 2020

Ulrich Moroder (born 4 October 1948 in Urtijëi) is an Italian artist from South Tyrol.

== Biography ==
Moroder was born in Urtijëi, South Tyrol, in northern Italy. He is a brother of recording artist Giorgio Moroder. From 1968 to 1969, he played for the ice hockey team HC Gherdëina, participating in and winning the Serie A tournament.

In 1974, he received training at the University of Applied Arts in Vienna (O. Oberhuber, A. Frohner). In 1976, he went to Provence, France, and in 1978 he attended the Académie de la Grande Chaumière in Paris. From 1980 to 1987, he had several study visits to New York and Los Angeles and from 1988 to 1993 in Rome. Moroder worked during his vocational apprenticeship and trained as a barrel painter in Urtijëi.

He currently lives and works between Vienna and Urtijëi.

== Exhibitions and works ==
Moroder has had exhibitions in Austria, Italy, Germany, the United States and France. The artist also used to be part of the South Tyrolean Artists Association. Some works of the artist have been sold to the City of Vienna, the Federal Ministry for Education and Cultural Affairs, the Museion Bolzano, and to the Ferdinandeum in Innsbruck.
