= Otto Moroder =

Austrian sculptor

Otto Moroder (born 29 January 1894 in Ortisei in Val Gardena; died 27 July 1977 in Mayrhofen, Zillertal) was an Austrian sculptor from South Tyrol.

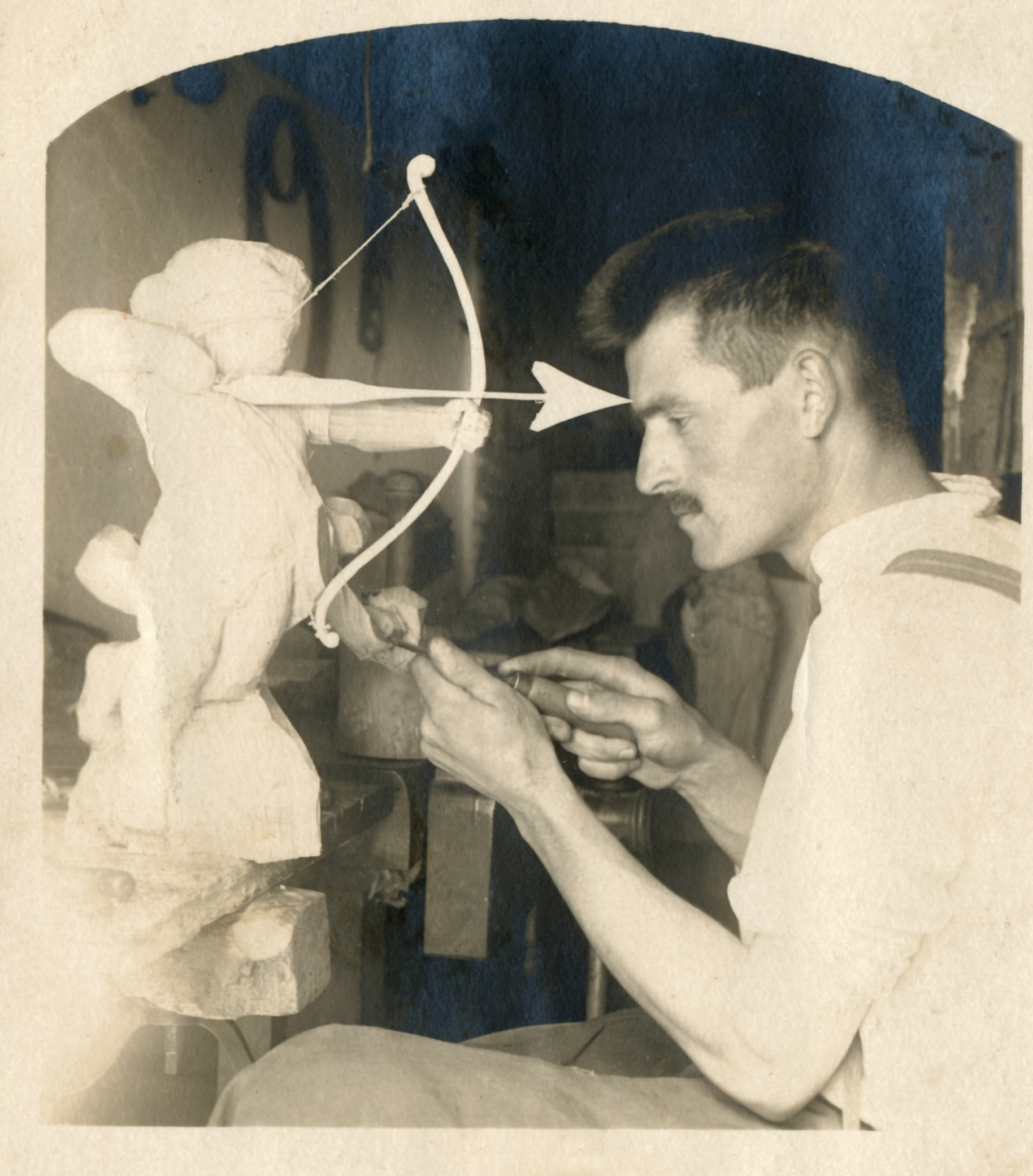
The sculptor Otto Moroder

== Biography ==
He was the last born son of Josef Moroder, he learned his trade in his father's workshop. In 1919 he married the Grödner Anna Knottner and settled in Mayrhofen in the Zillertal. The marriage produced two sons, Klaus and Albin, and a daughter Anne Marie. The girl died aged 10 weeks. The family adopted a boy named Rudolf Geisler-Moroder, who founded a woodcarving school in Elbigenalp in the Lechtal. In 1916, on the occasion of the centenary of the Tyrolean Kaiserjäger, Otto made a created a statue on the subject of the traditional "Tyrolean firefighter", which was presented to the Kaiser on his birthday. The Emperor gave the artist in a private audience on 16 September 1916 in the Schönbrunn Palace and awarded him with a golden clock. In 1977 he was awarded the Cross of Honor for Art and Science of the Republic of Austria . Because of his style and his motives, Otto Moroder was nicknamed the "Albin Egger-Lienz of Wood Carver".

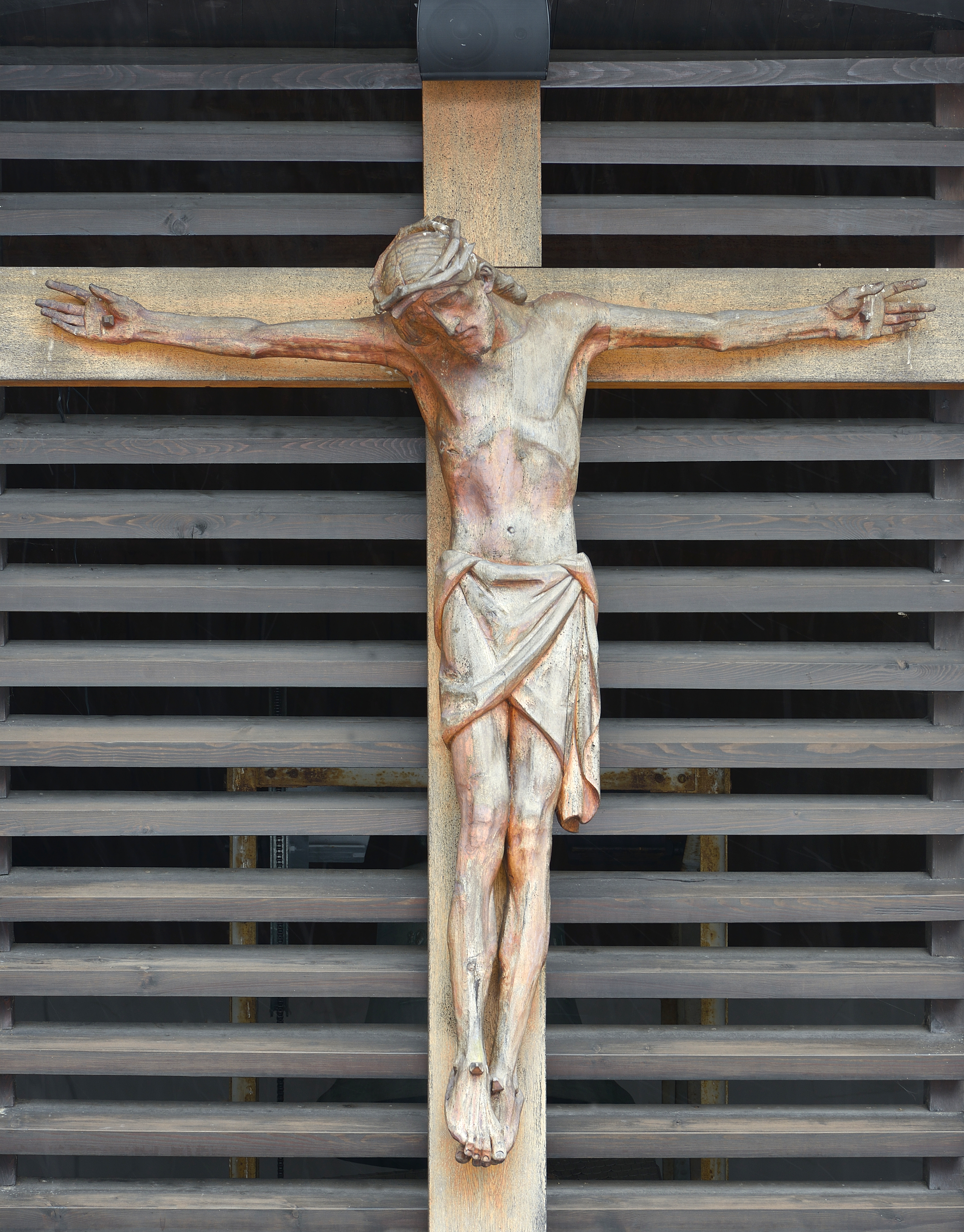
Wooden cross of Otto Moroder at the chapel of the Waldfriedhof in Mayerhofen

== Main works ==
In the Viennese Museum of Military History, there is the Zirbenholz sculpture Kameradentreue, created around 1918 .

In 1964, the forest cemetery was built in Mayerhofen. The large wooden cross in the cemetery chapel was created by the sculptor Otto Moroder.

For the Fatima pilgrimage church in Droß in the Waldviertel, he created a statue of the Virgin Mary.

In the St. Canisius Church in Vienna, consecrated in 2002, a Madonna carved by Otto Moroder in 1943 stands on the crescent moon, which was saved in 1995 during a major fire of the previous church.

For the parish Zwentendorf on the Danube, he also created a statue of the Virgin Mary.
