= Johann Baptist Moroder =

Austrian sculptor (1870–1932)

Johann Baptist Moroder (Urtijëi, 20 February 1870 - Urtijëi, 24 May 1932) was an Austrian sculptor. He mainly focused on sculptures of bigger sizes representing Christian sacred figures; nowadays his works are mainly spread in the Italian region of Alto Adige.

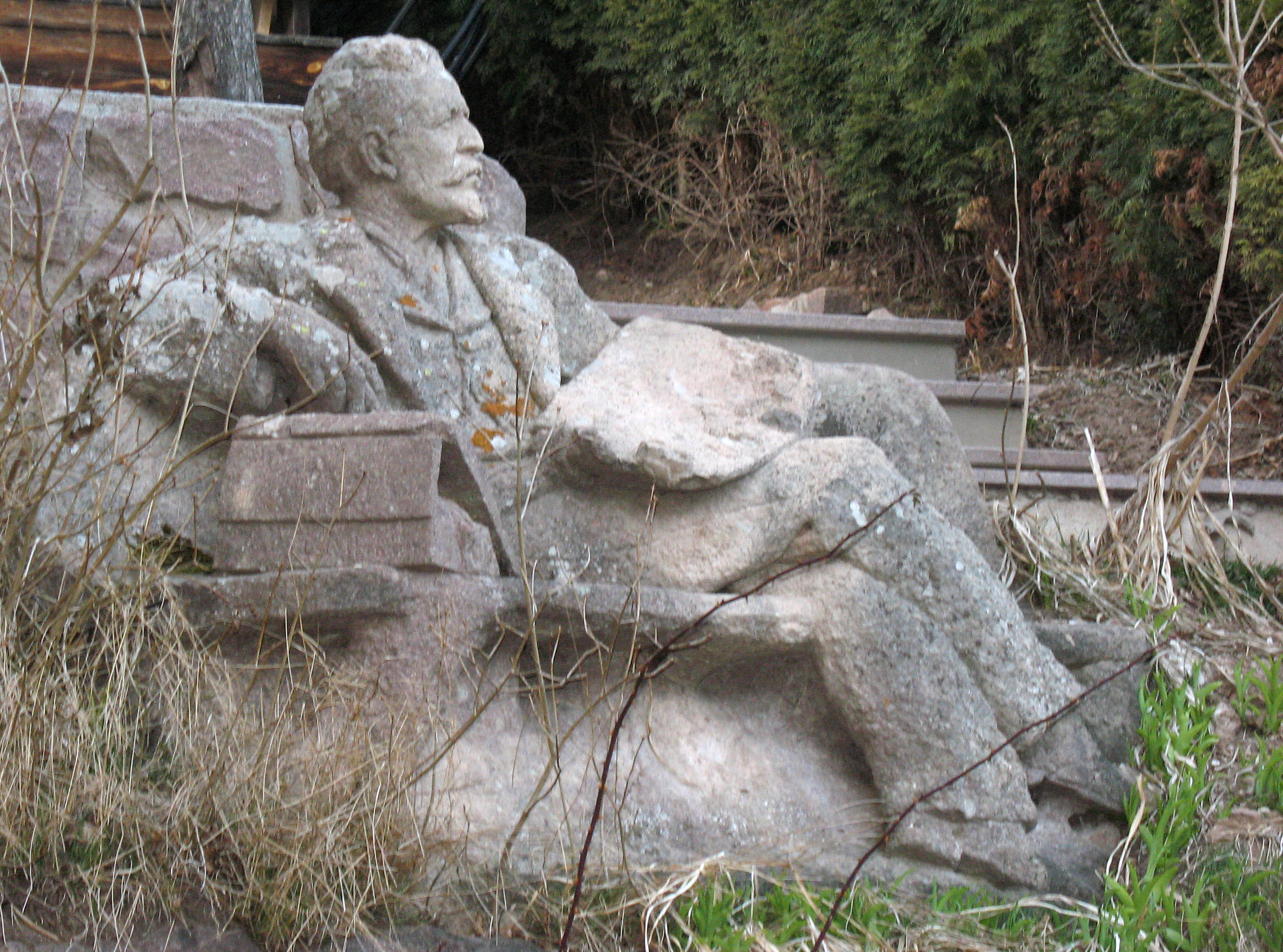
A monument to his father, the painter Josef Moroder-Lusenberg, in the garden of Villa Sonnenburg in Ortisei.

== Biography ==
He was the first born child of painter Josef Moroder-Lusenberg and his first wife Annamaria Sanoner-Mauritz, he was born in Hof Lusenberg-Jumbierch in Ortisei. At the age of 14 he began learning wood sculpting in his father's workshop in Jumbierch. From 1886 to 1888 he worked in Franz Tavella's workshop in Ortisei alongside his cousin, Rudolf Moroder-Lenert, and Ludwig Moroder. In 1887 he was taken as a pupil by professor Franz Haider: the director of the school of art of Ortisei.

In 1895 he married Katharina Bernardi de Ianesc who bore 11 of his children. Between 1910 and 1918 he taught design and modelling in the school of art of Ortisei.

== Works ==
- 1896 Monument dedicated to his father Josef Moroder Lusenberg in porphyry.
- He designed and constructed his home and workshop later renamed “Villa Venezia” as it followed the venecian style of architecture. The estate was constructed between 1902 and 1903.
- 1900 Angel on the tomb of Insam-Prinoth in Ortisei's graveyard.
- 1902 Pietà in marble in the tomb of the Purger family.
- 1904 Statue representing an ancient Roman legionary in front of Villa Venezia.
- 1908 creation of the altar in the church of the holy trinity in Offenburg in Baden Wuerttemberg with marble sculptures.
- 1916 he was tasked by Conrad von Hötzendorf; a military commander to produce four big sculptures for the inauguration for the construction of the first railway in Val Garden, these statues included: Saint Barbara patron of the railway workers, Saint Peter, Saint Paul and the Tirolese Eagle.
- The holy trinity over the choir of the pastoral church of Ortisei.
- The museum of Val Gardena is currently exposing two sculptures of J.B. Moroder representing Oswald von Wolkenstein on a horse, which he sold as he was lacking funds during WWI and Saint Barbara which was originally located near the railway tunnel in Ortisei.

== Images ==
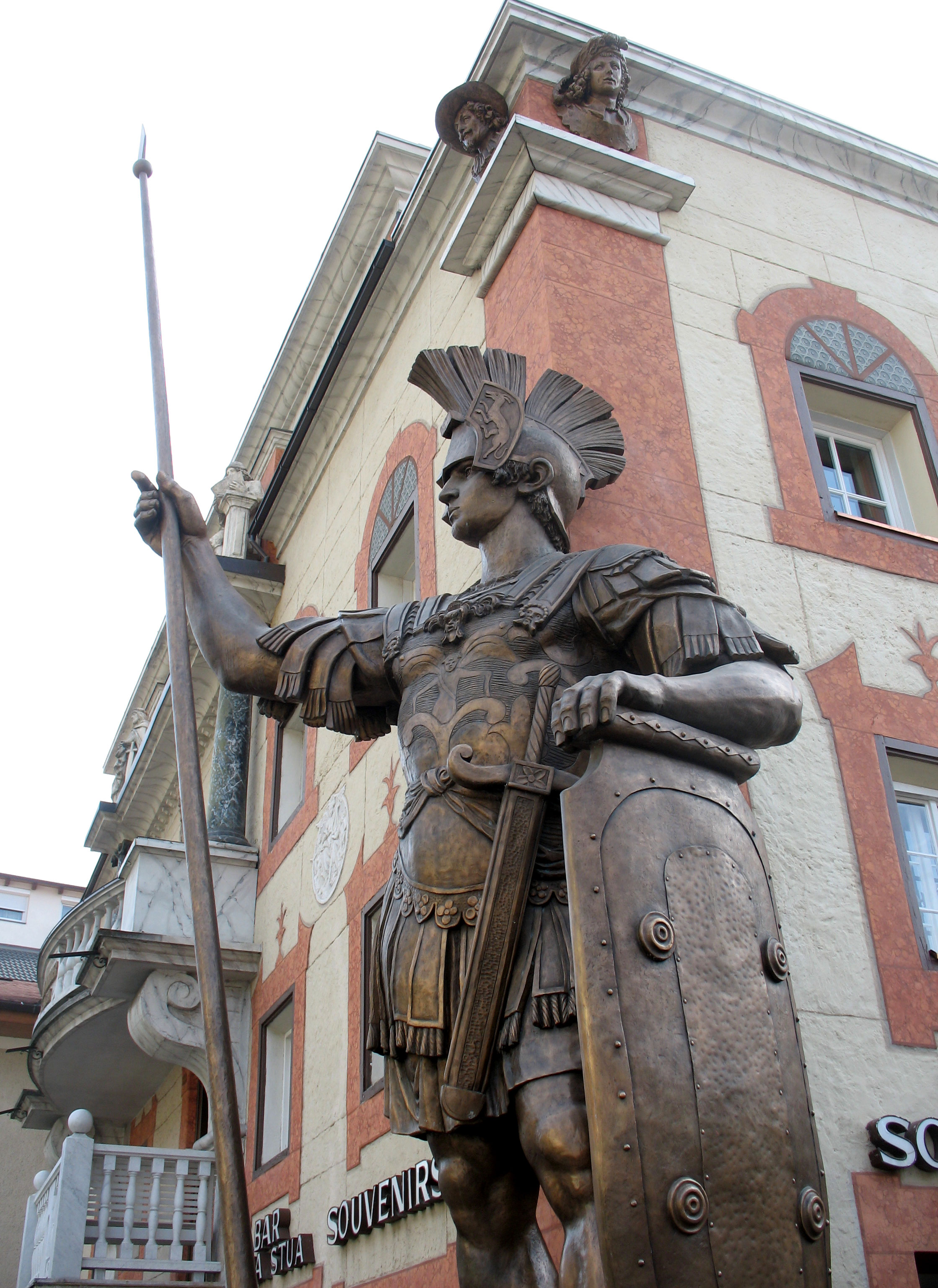
Roman legionary, Villa Venezia in Ortisei

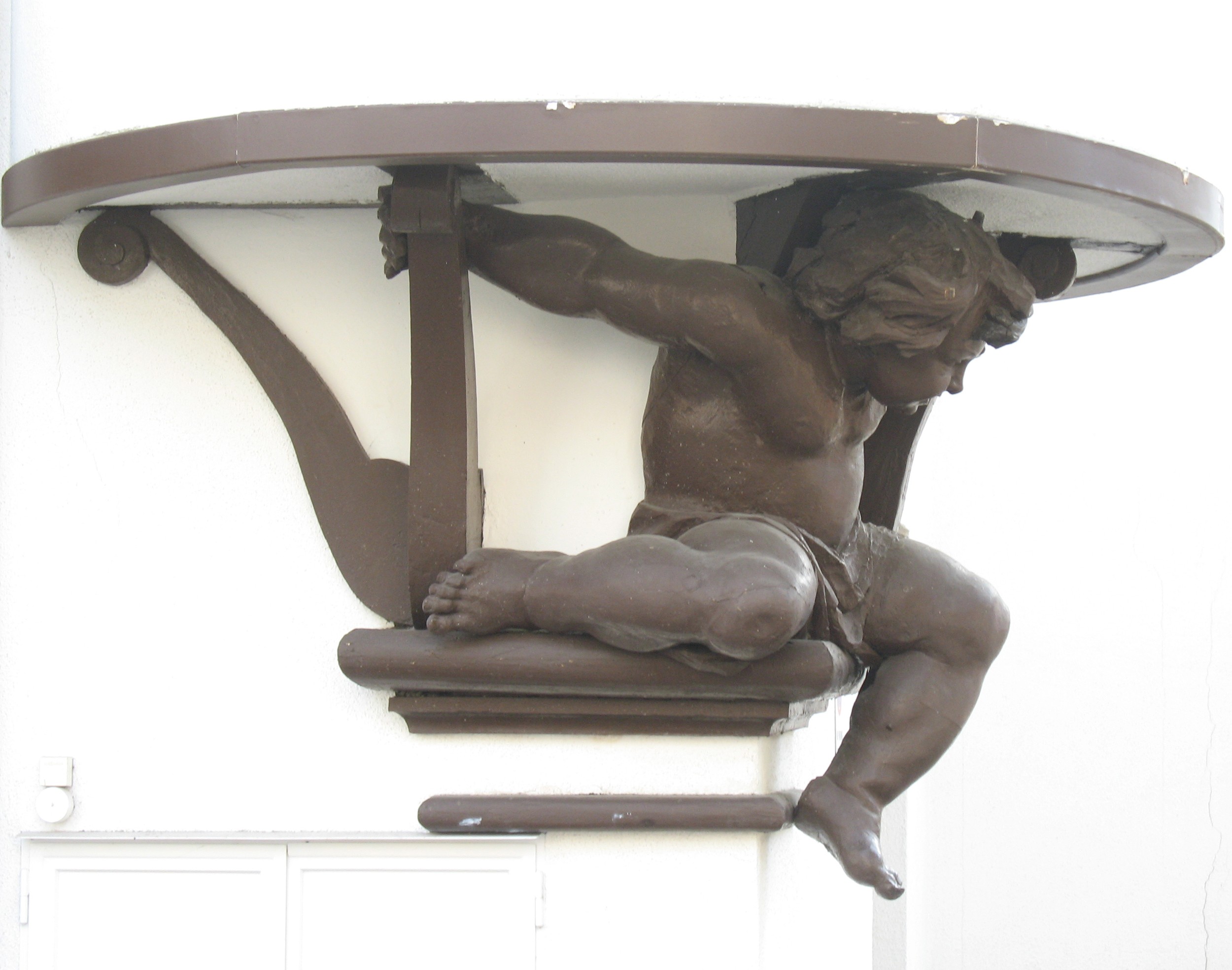
Putto at Hotel Madonna in Ortisei

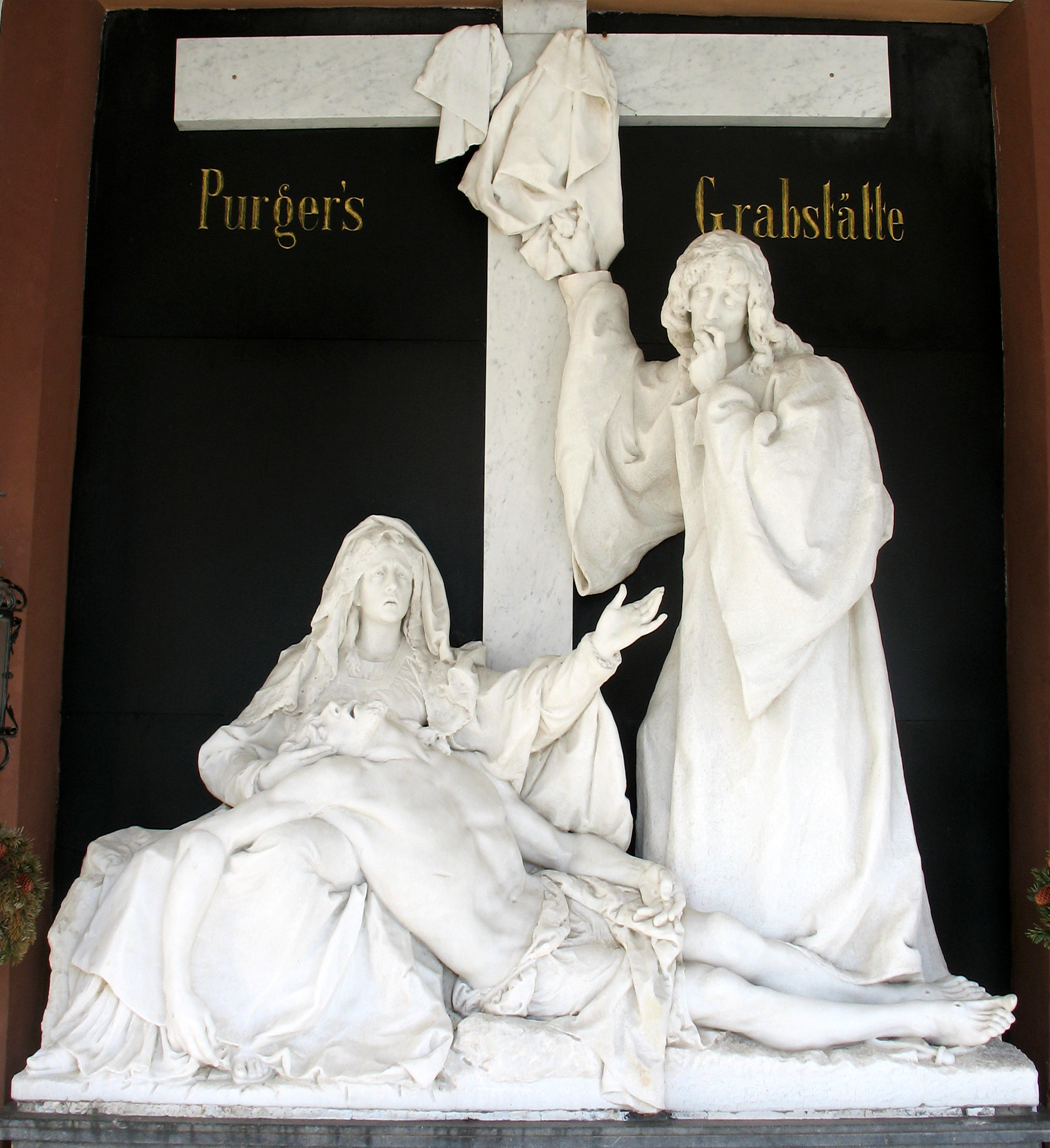
Pietà in marble, Ortisei graveyard

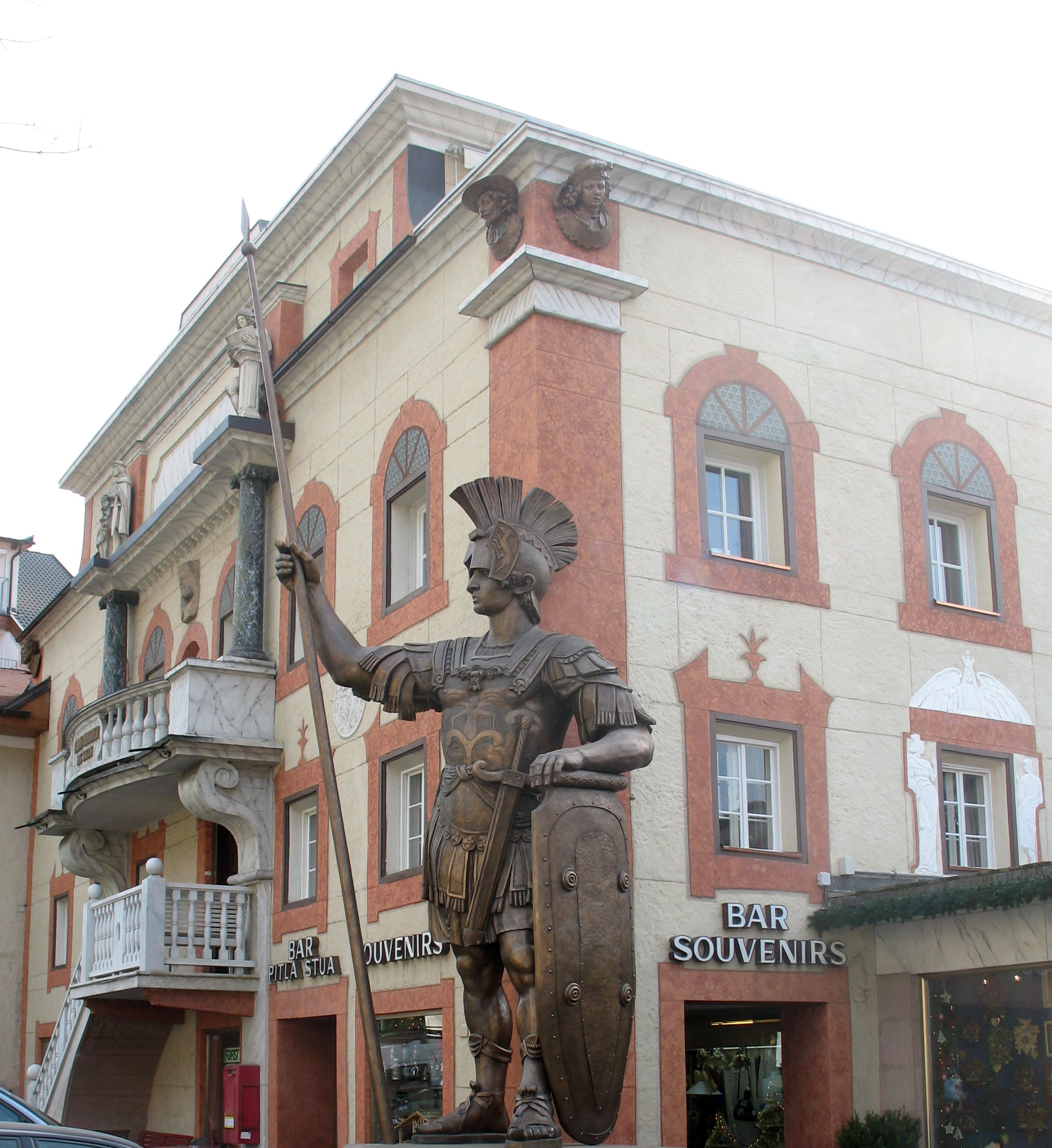
“Villa Venezia” in Ortisei, Val Gardena.

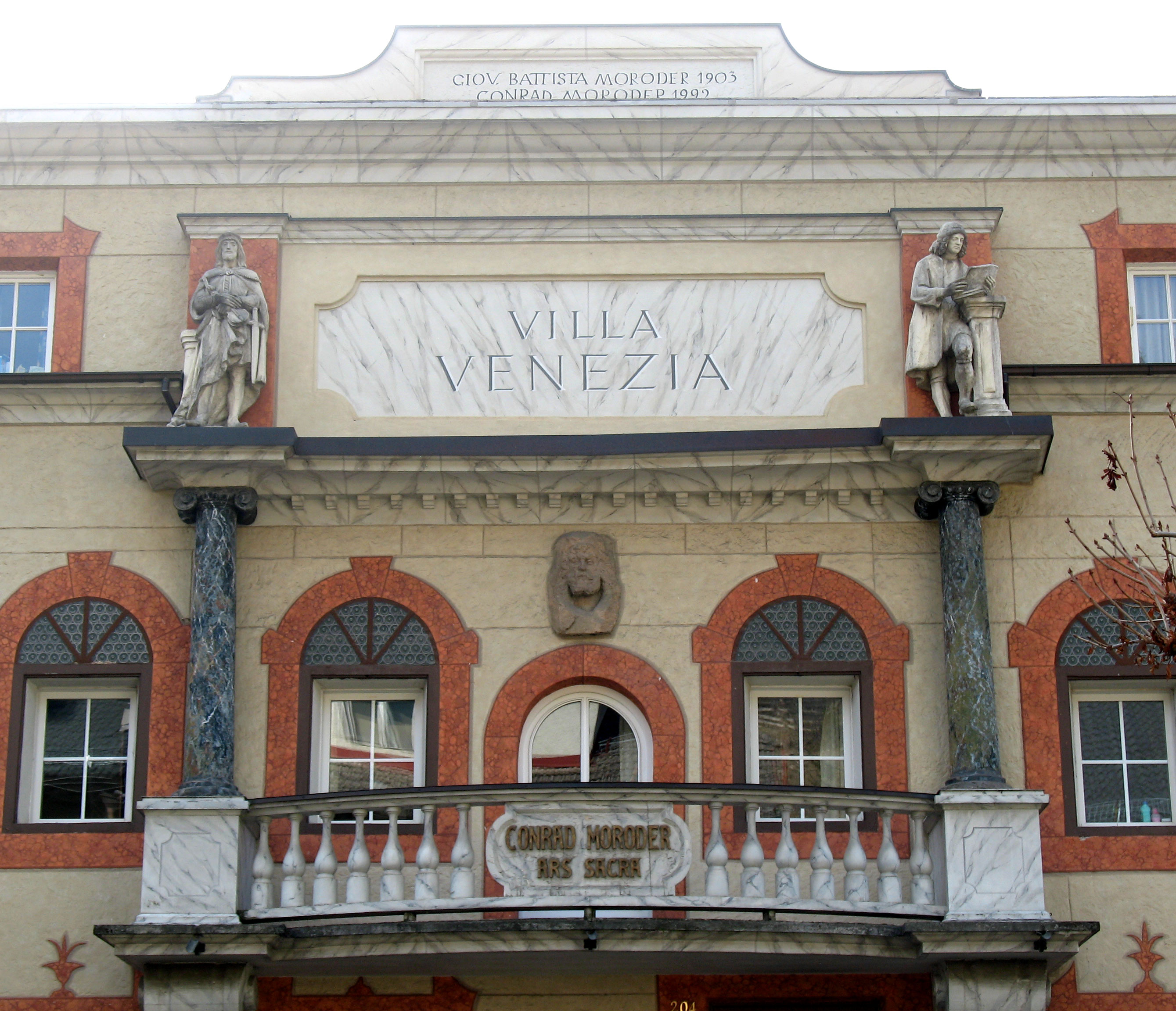
Villa Venezia's facade representing two of his sons: Osvald and Walter. In the middle a damaged statue of Albrecht Dürer is recognisable.

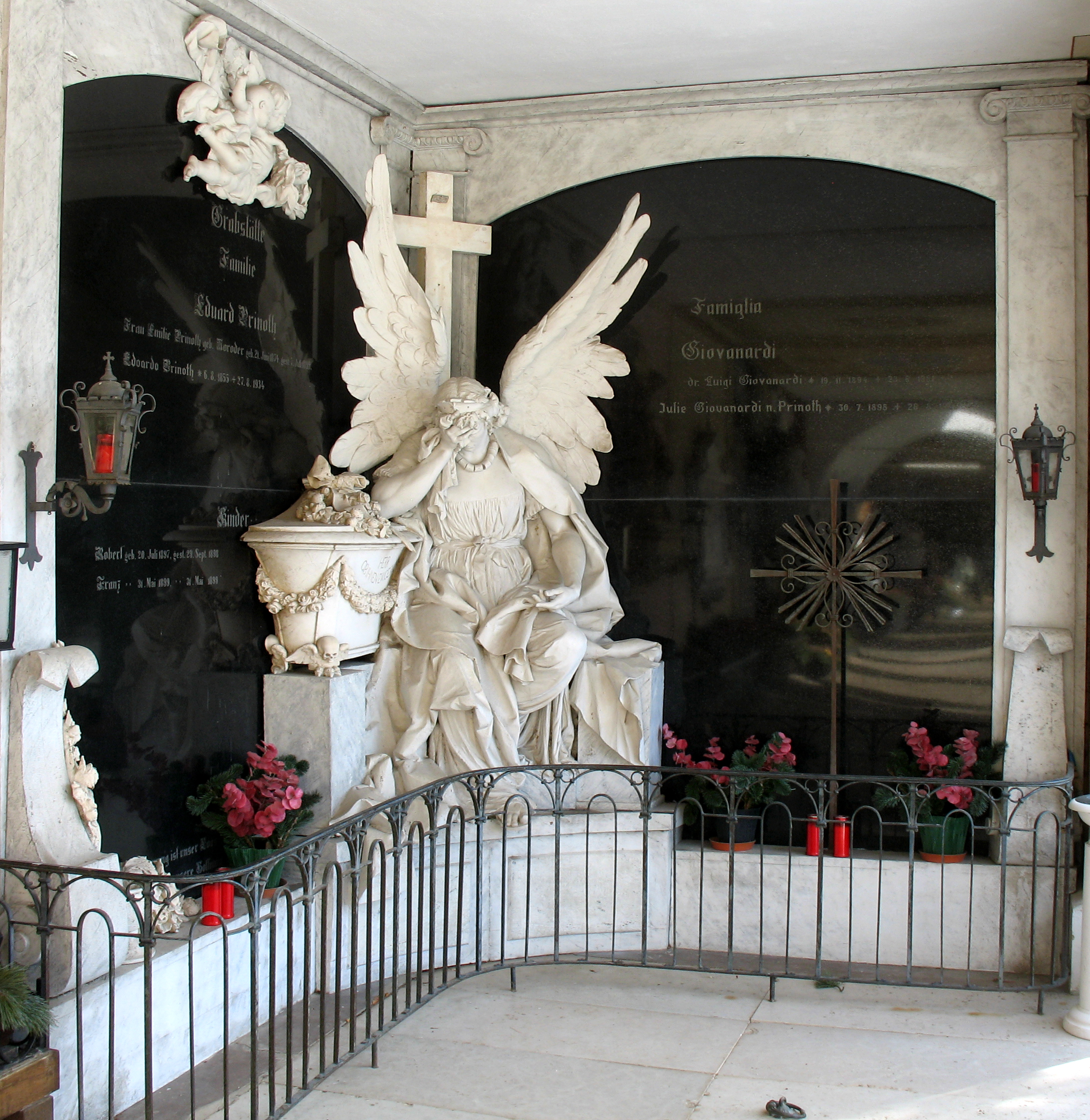
Angel on the Insam-Prinot family tomb, Ortisei graveyard

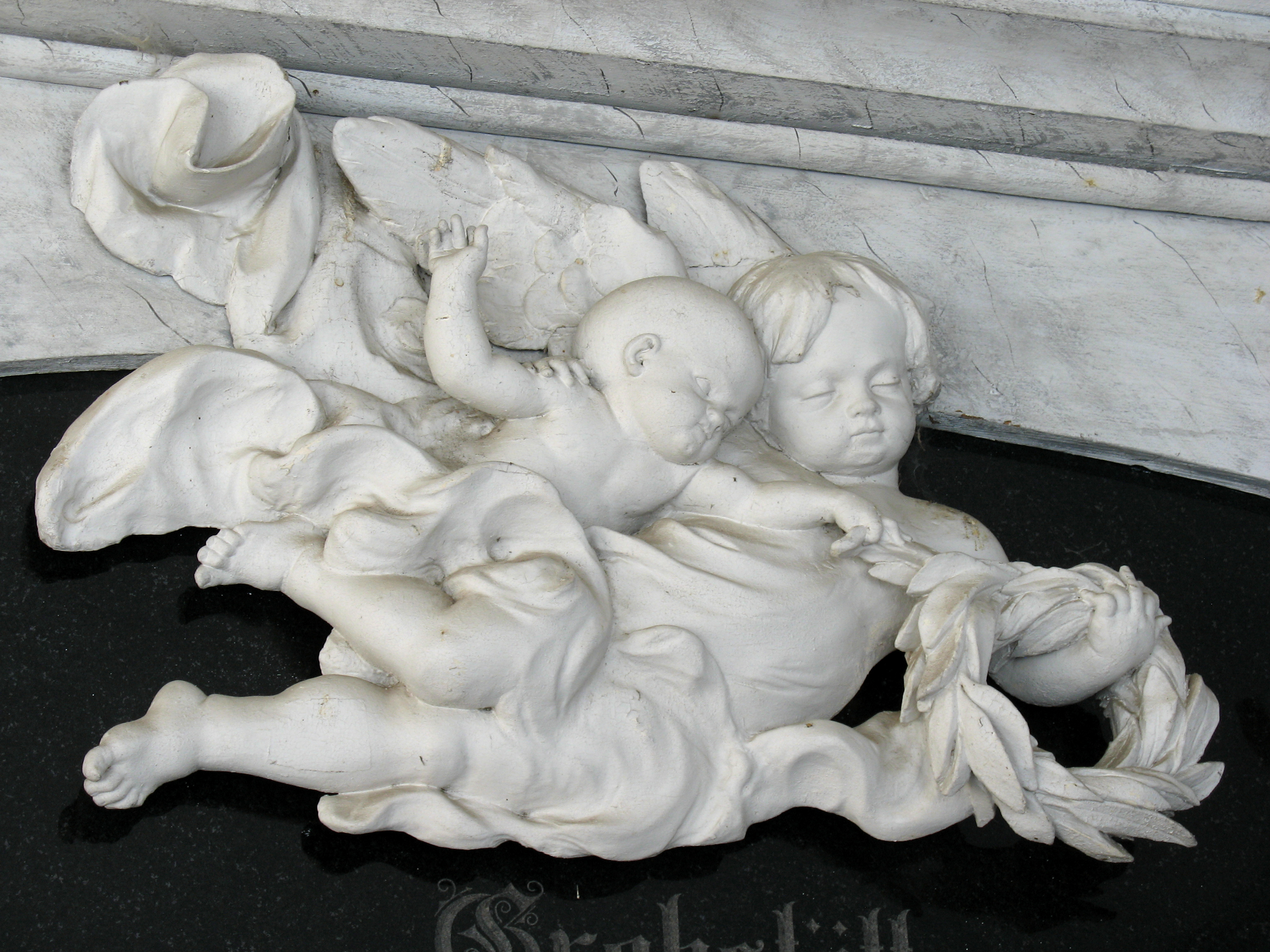
Details on the Insam-Prinoth tombal monument
