= Agnes Neururer =

Austrian luger

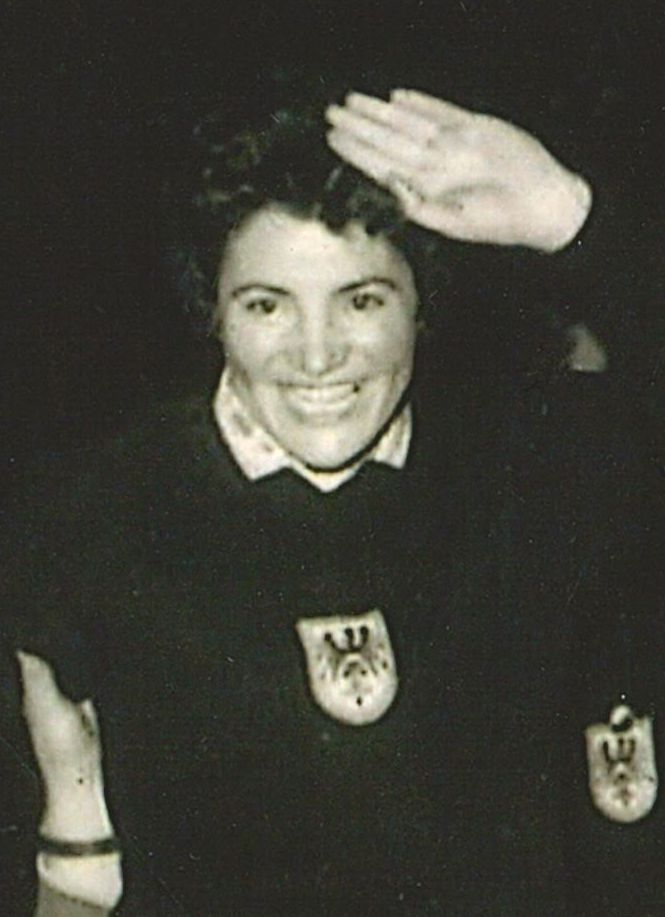

Personal information
- Born: 28 January 1932
- Died: 17 March 2025 (aged 93)
- Relative: Otto Neururer (Great-uncle)
Medal record
Women's Luge
World Championships
Bronze medal – third place	1959 Villard-de-Lans	Women's singles

Agnes Neururer was an Austrian luger who competed in the late 1950s. She won the bronze medal in the women's singles event at the 1959 FIL World Luge Championships in Villard-de-Lans, France.
