= Friedrich (Rico) Moroder =

Tyrolean sculptor (1880–1937)

Friedrich Moroder (born 21 March 1880, Ortisei in Val Gardena; died 24 January 1937), also known as Rico, was a South Tyrolean sculptor.

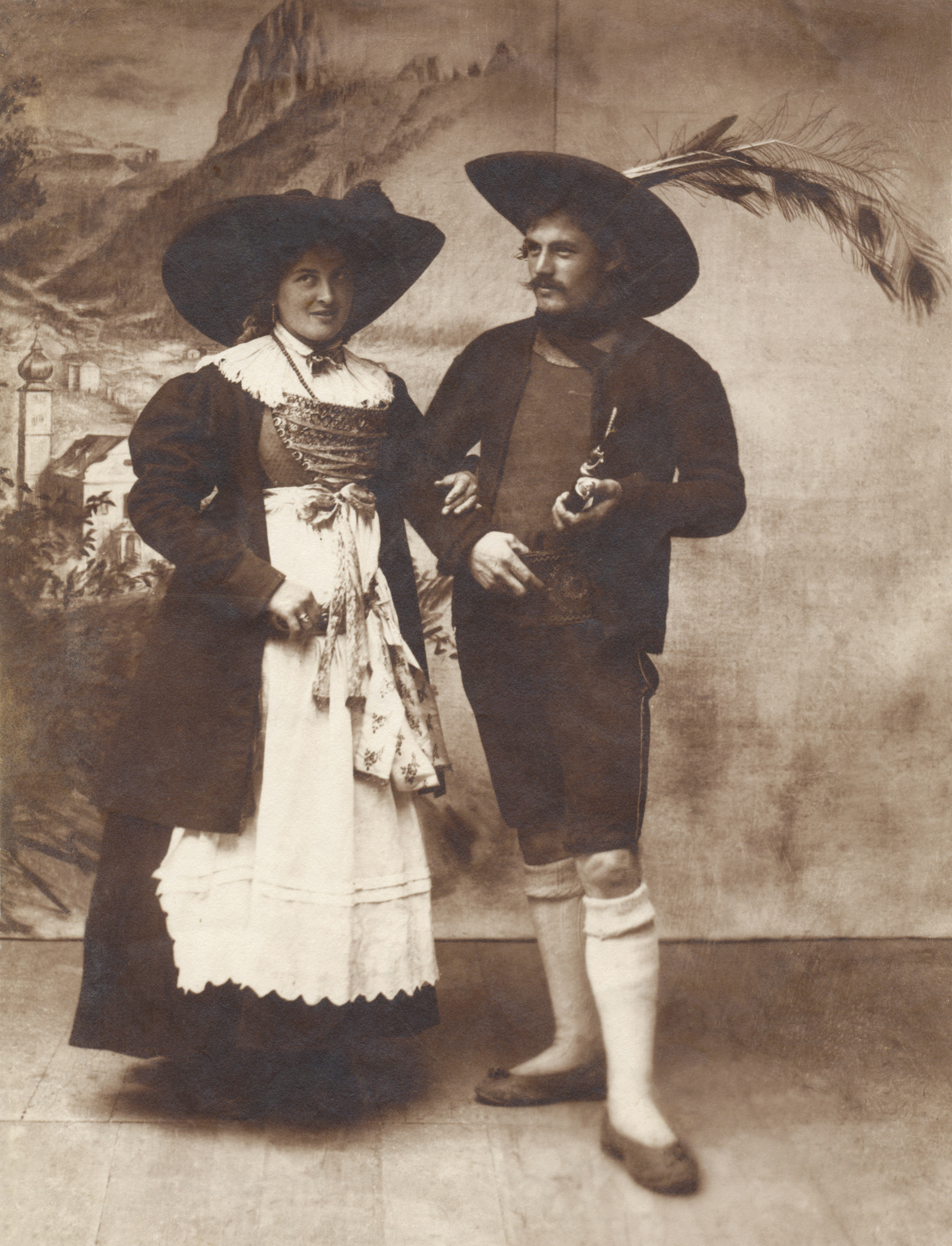
Friedrich Moroder Jumbierch and Maria Moroder Scurciá in traditional Tyrolean outfits

== Biography ==
He was the first born son of the painter Josef Moroder Lusenberg and the Felizita Unterplatzer in Ortisei in Val Gardena. He learned how to sculpt in his father's workshop. His two sons, Viktor and Bruno, were also trained as sculptors in his workshop in Ortisei. During the First World War he was sent to Galicia to the Russian front, like many Tyrolean firefighters. His sculpting style was mainly focused on the creation of sacred art and church equipment. Moroder married Runggaldier Genoveva on 11 October 1904.

== Gallery ==
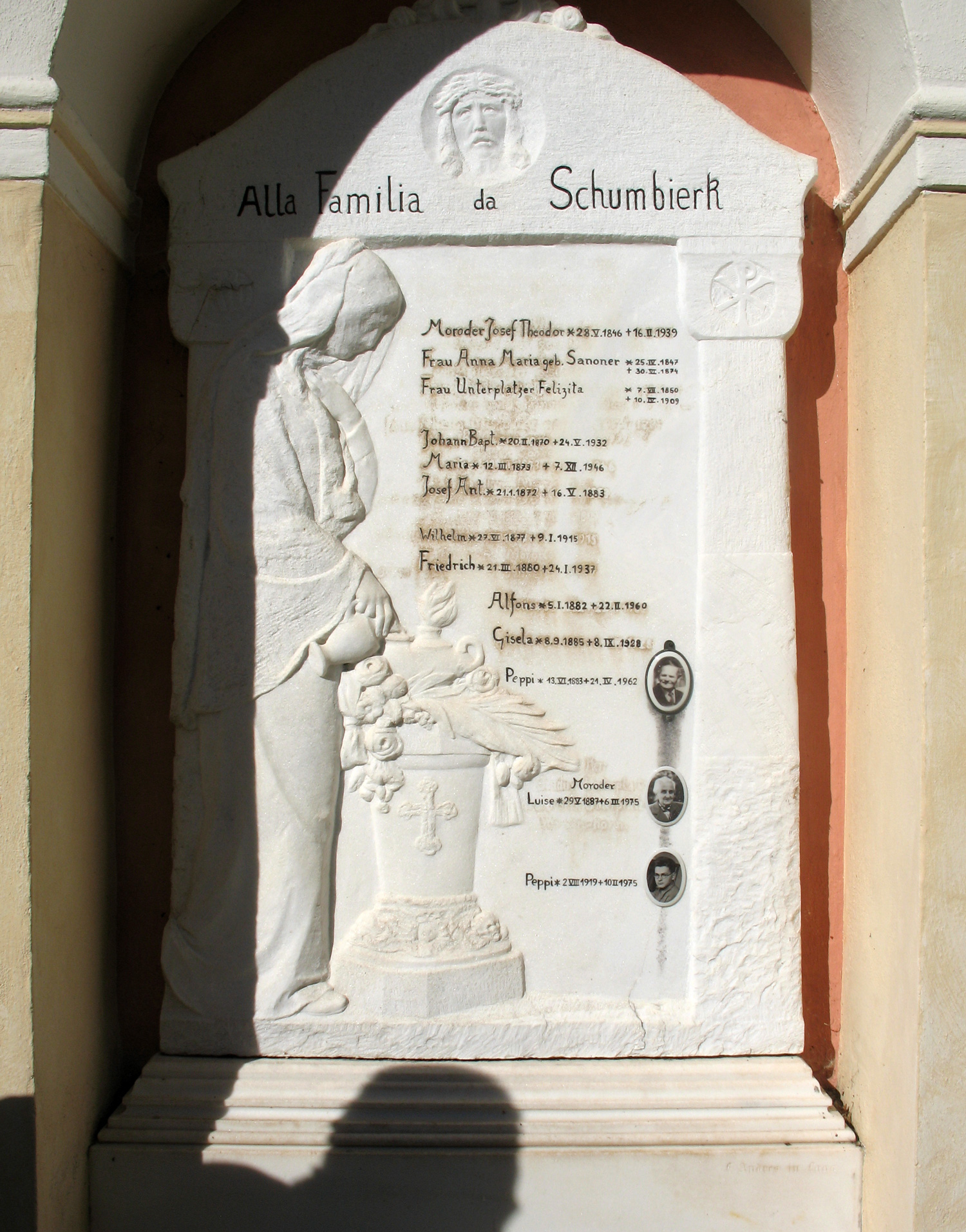
Grabstein he worked with Josef Moroder-Lusenberg on

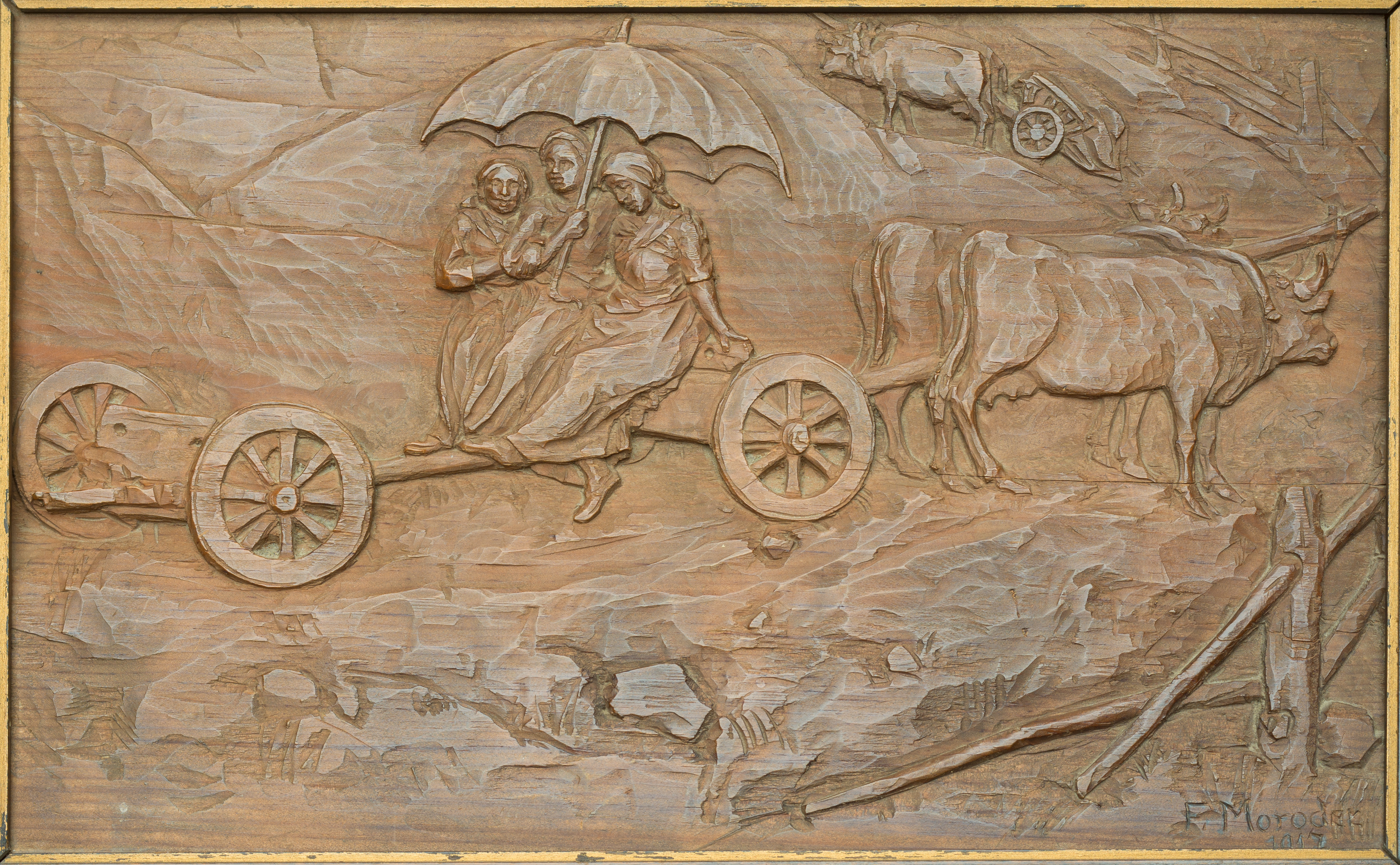
Relief Friedrich Rico Moroder 1917

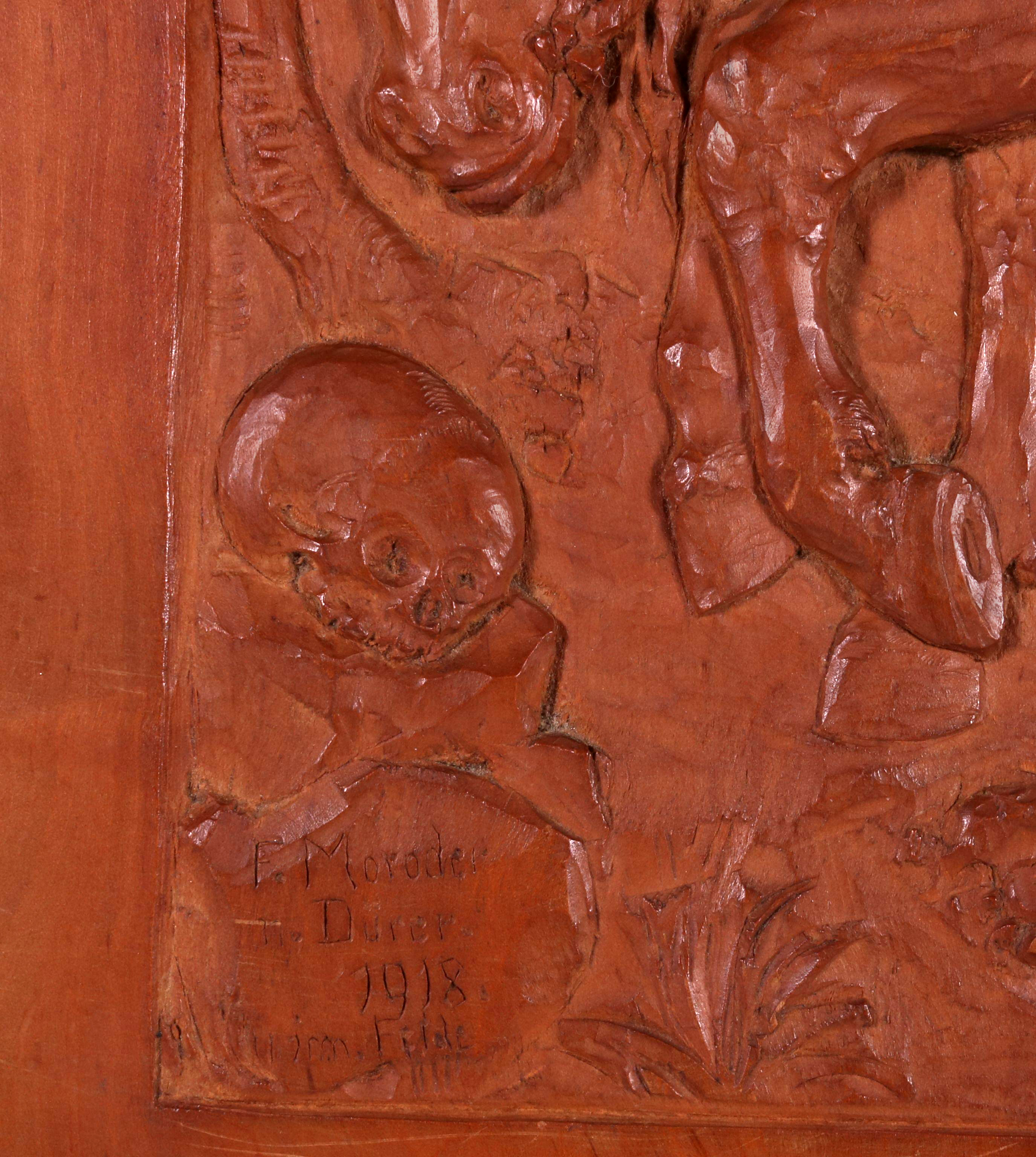
Relief Friedrich Rico Moroder 1918 Ritter Dürer detail

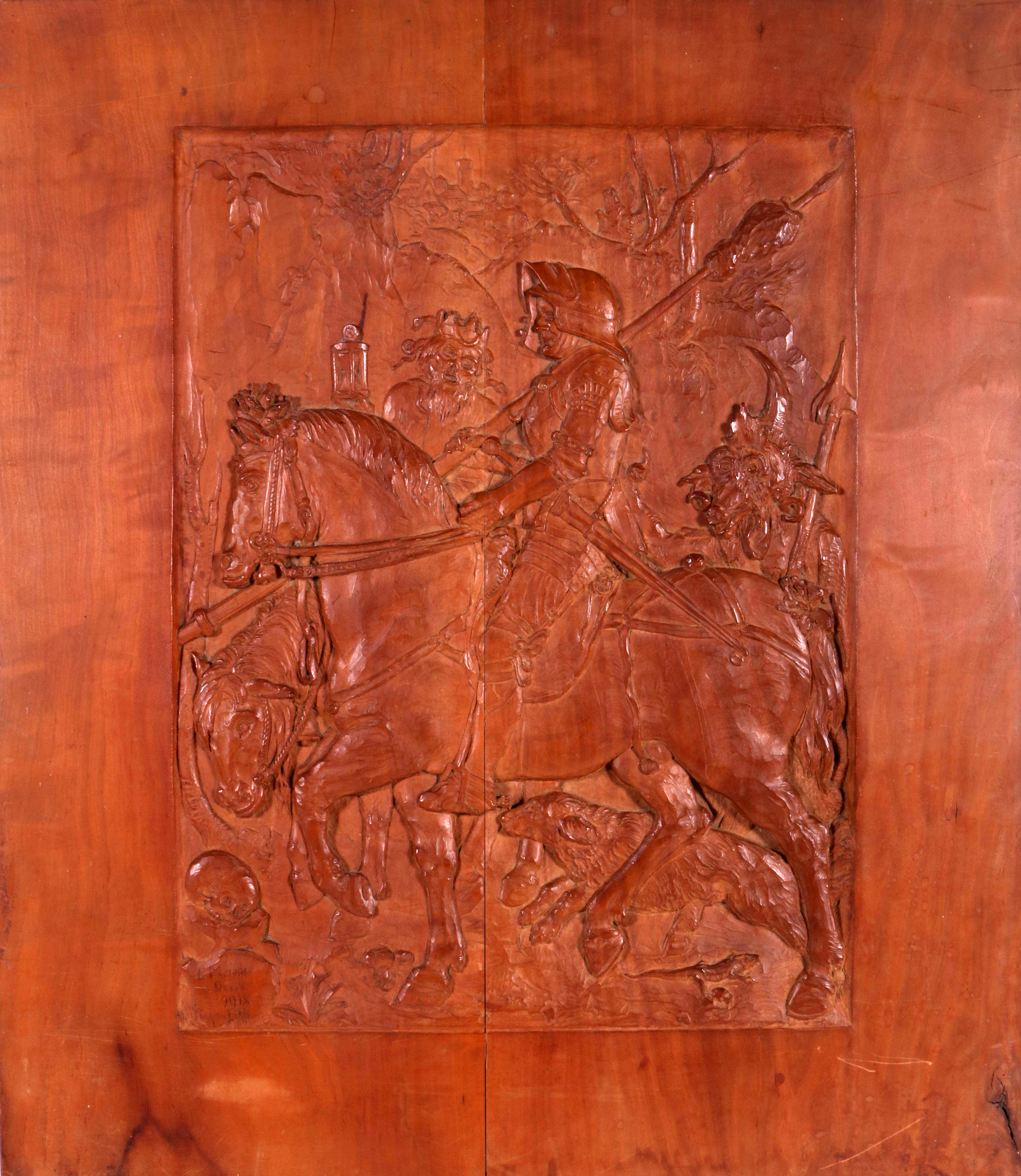
Relief Friedrich Rico Moroder 1918 Ritter Dürer

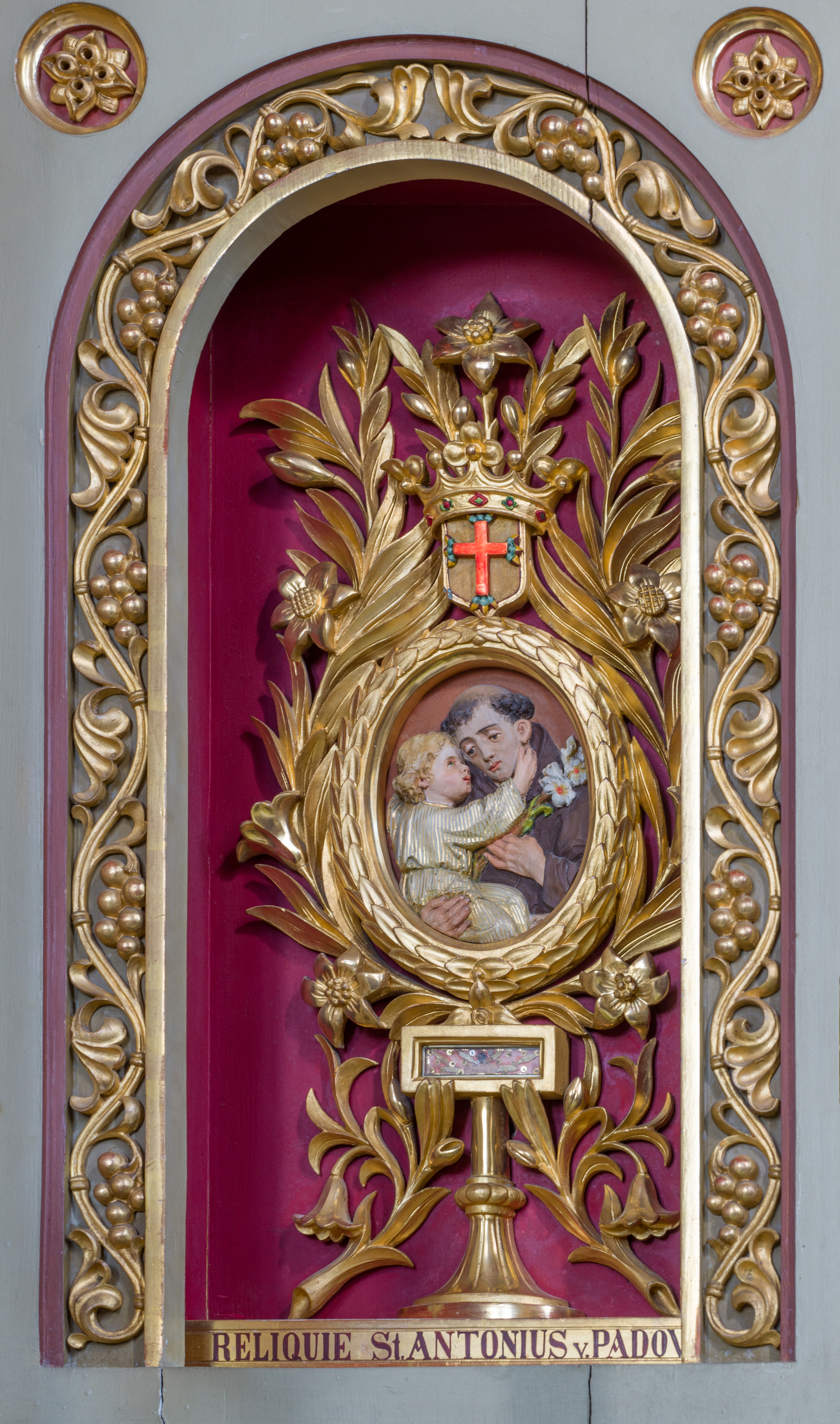
Woodcarved reliquary of Saint Anthony by Moroder in the parish church of Urtijëi

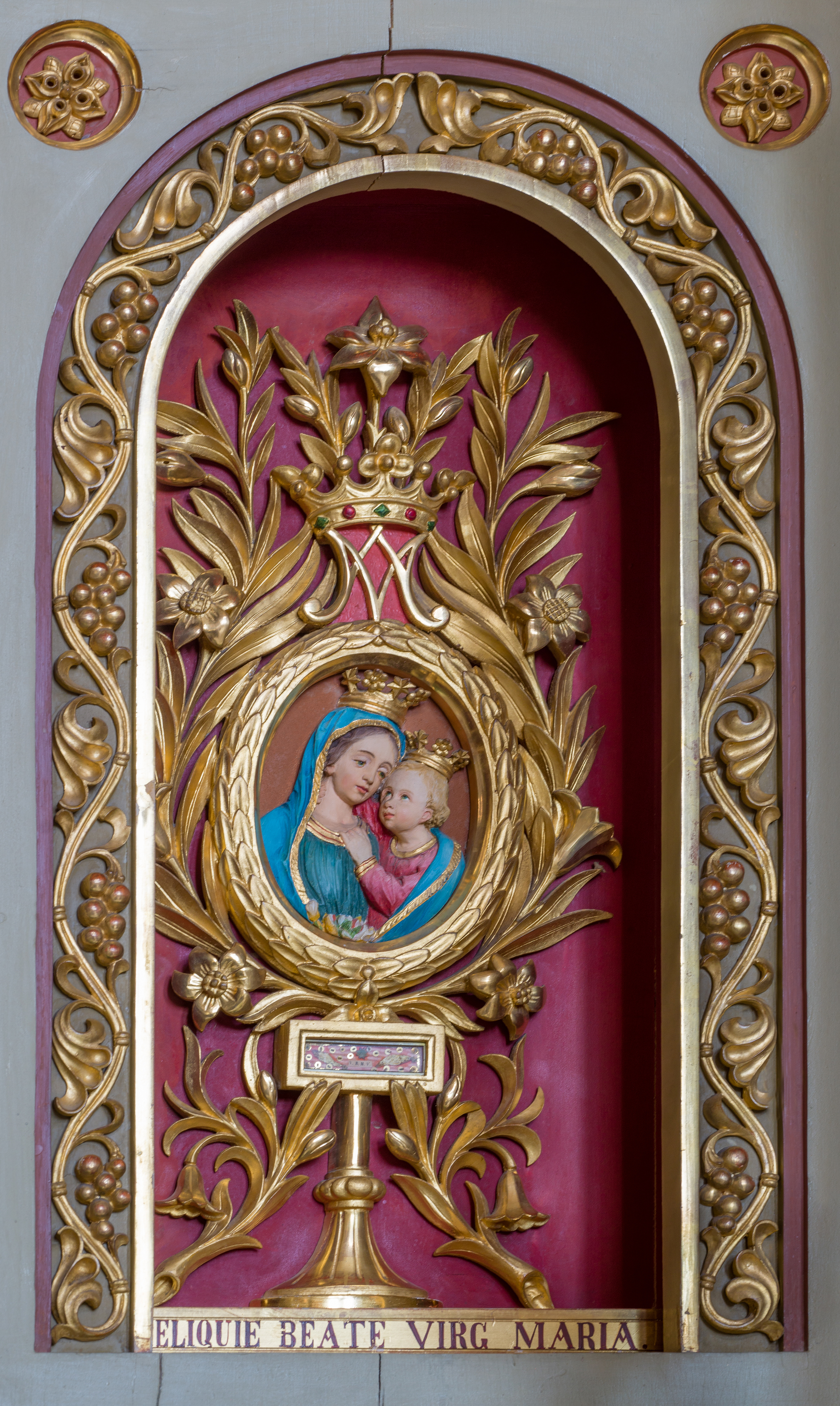
Reliquary of the Virgin by Moroder in the parish church of Urtijëi.
