= Urtijëi =

- Comune
- Chemun de Urtijëi; Comune di Ortisei; Gemeinde St. Ulrich
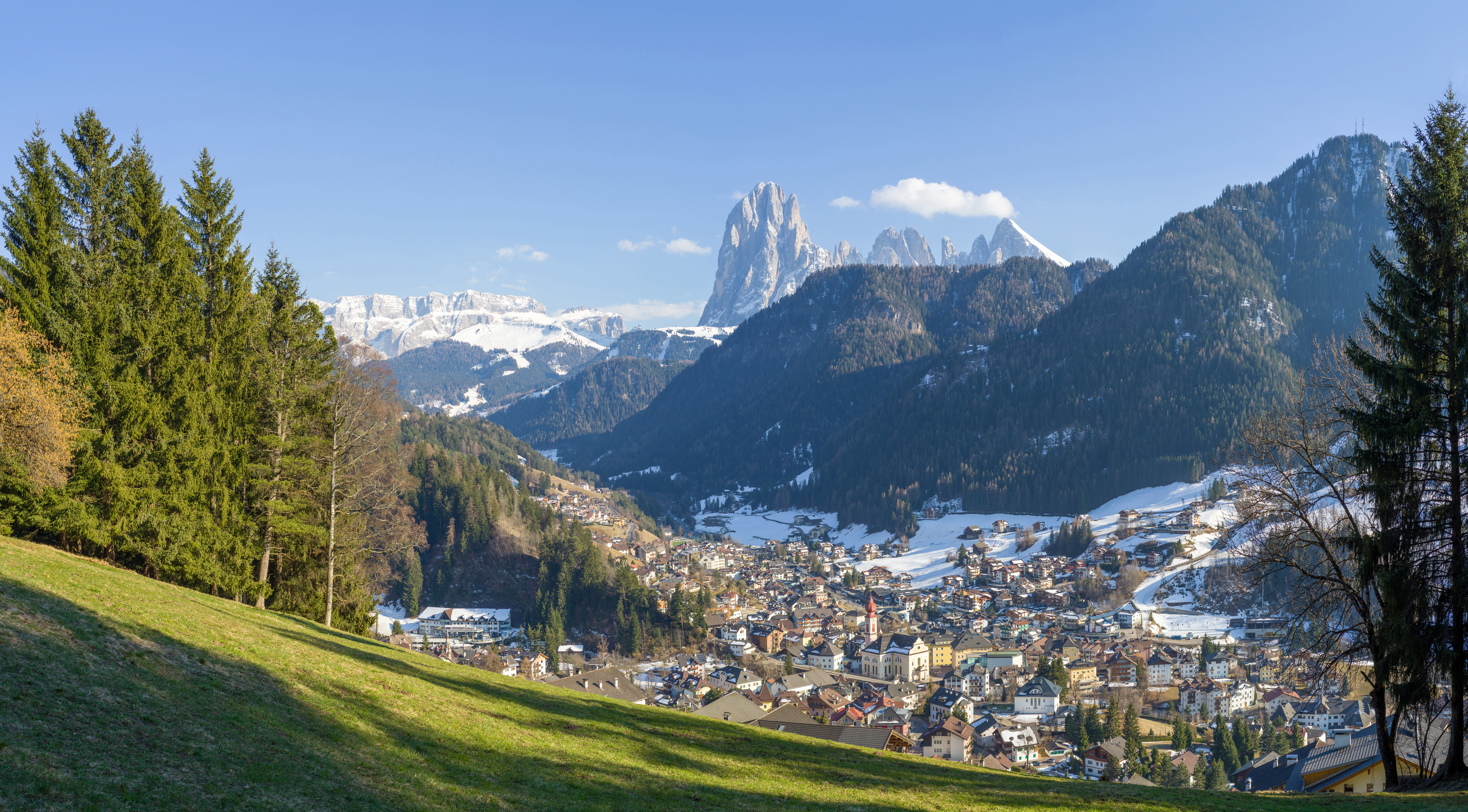
- View of Urtijëi

- Location within Italy Location within Trentino-Alto Adige/Südtirol
- Coordinates: 46°34′N 11°40′E
- Country: Italy
- Region: Trentino-Alto Adige/Südtirol
- Province: South Tyrol (BZ)

Government
  - Mayor: Tobia Moroder

Area
  - Total: 24.3 km^{2} (9.4 sq mi)
- Elevation: 1,230 m (4,040 ft)

Population (31 July 2024)
  - Total: 4,741
  - Density: 195/km^{2} (505/sq mi)
- Demonym(s): Italian: gardenesi German: Sankt Ulricher
- Time zone: UTC+1 (CET)
  - Summer (DST): UTC+2 (CEST)
- Postal code: 39046
- Dialing code: 0471
- Patron saint: San Udalricus
- Saint day: July 4
- Website: Official website

Urtijëi (Ladin: [uʀtiˈʒɜi̯]; German: St. Ulrich in Gröden [zaŋkt ˈʊlrɪç ɪn ˈɡrøːdn̩]; Italian: Ortisei [ortiˈzɛi]) is a town of 4,637 inhabitants in South Tyrol in northern Italy. It occupies the Val Gardena within the Dolomites, a mountain chain that is part of the Alps.

== Geography ==
Urtijëi lies roughly in the middle of the Val Gardena (Gherdëina), which runs east–west. The municipality, counted as part of Ladinia, covers an area of 24.25 km², but it includes only the orographically right (northern) side of the valley with the main settlement area (1170–1350 m a.s.l.) and the rising slopes behind it. The left (southern) side of the valley beyond the Grödner Bach (Derjon), with the villages of Pufels (Bula), Runggaditsch (Runcadic), and Überwasser (Sureghes), belongs instead—although Ladin-speaking and culturally as well as economically oriented toward Val Gardena—to the municipality of Kastelruth (Ćiastel). The same is true for the Seiser Alm (Mont Sëuc) and the Puflatsch (Bulacia) plateau, which rise up south of these villages.

To the north and northeast, above the valley floor of Urtijëi, lie the western foothills of the Geisler Group, part of the Dolomites. In the northeast, the municipality reaches its highest point at Seceda (2519 m, Secëda). South of Seceda, the Pitschberg (2363 m, Pic) projects into the valley. To the west of Seceda begins the Raschötz ridge, much of which is protected within the Puez-Geisler Nature Park. On its highest elevations lie the alpine meadows of Innerraschötz and Außerraschötz.

Urtijëi borders the following municipalities: Kastelruth, Villnöß, Lajen, and Santa Cristina Gherdëina.

== History ==
The Ladin-language name Urtijëi, as well as its Italian equivalent Ortisei, derive from a farmstead in the settlement center called Ortiseyt (derives from the Latin word urtica and the suffix -etum, with the meaning "place of nettles"), which is documented as early as the 13th century and is still attested in Bolzano records in 1497 as a place name (“Hanns von Ortiseit”). The farm later appears in documents under the name Mauriz and today is one of the oldest hotels in the valley.

The German name St. Ulrich, on the other hand, goes back to the Catholic parish of the town, which is dedicated to the Epiphany but also to St. Ulrich, the patron saint of the place. The Ulrich patronage—a typical indicator of ownership—also recalls the medieval possessions of the episcopal church of Augsburg in the Eisack Valley and Gröden area.

Since the 17th century, a large part of the population of Urtijëi has been engaged in woodcarving, sacred sculpture, altar building, and the wooden toy industry. In the second half of the 19th century, Urtijëi was first discovered by mountaineers such as Paul Grohmann. Winter tourism received decisive impetus from Emil Terschak, who lived in the town from 1893 to 1900.

The Gröden arts and crafts, especially woodcarving, are well known. For over two centuries, Urtijëi was regarded as an international center of woodcarving. At the turn of the 19th to the 20th century, sacred wood sculpture reached its artistic and economic peak at the art school in Urtijëi founded by Ferdinand Demetz, also thanks to the training of several artists from Gröden at the academies in Vienna and Munich. With the Second Vatican Council, sacred sculpture in Urtijëi suffered a severe setback.

From 1860 to 1914, Urtijëi experienced a relevant economic growth due to the opening of a major road connecting Val Gardena to the main railroad; as a result the local woodcarving industry flourished. International tourism developed through the discovery of the Dolomites first by English tourists, and subsequently visitors from other parts of Austria-Hungary as well as the German Empire. Currently, the town's economy is mostly based on winter skiing tourism, summer hiking tourism, and woodcarving.

From the 1960s onward, only small figures, mostly machine-carved, found buyers—mainly in the German-speaking countries and in the United States.

Until 1960, the town was connected to Klausen by the Val Gardena railway. The railway was built mainly by Russian prisoners of war, who were used as forced laborers during the First World War.

In 1970, Urtijëi was the venue for the Alpine Ski World Championships.

=== Coat of arms ===
The emblem shows Saint Ulrich, with the bishop's vestments and a gold cross in his right hand, mounted on a horse, with gold harness and a blue saddle pad, on three green mountains on a gold field. The emblem is decorated with a blue chief, with three small silver shields alternating with two golden bees; the bees symbolize the laboriousness of the inhabitants. The coat of arms was granted in 1907 and reappointed in 1970.

Blazon: Or, St Ulrich in bishops vestments with a cross Or in right hand, mounted on a white horse Proper with harness of the field and a saddle blanket Azure on a trimount Vert; On a chief Azure, two bees Or between three escutcheons Argent.

== Main sights ==
- Parish Church of Urtijëi, made in neoclassical style with baroque elements in the last part of the 18th century.
- Church of St. Jacob, of ancient foundation, it was remodeled in style Late-Gothic style during the 17th century. It preserves frescoes from the second half of the 15th century and copies of the original baroque furnishings.
- Church of St. Antonius, built in the second half of the 17th century, it combines the simple Renaissance style structure with a predominantly baroque decorative structure.
- Church of St. Anna, located in the perimeter of the municipal cemetery, it is in Late-Gothic style. Inside it preserves baroque furnishings.
- Museum Gherdëina, the local heritage museum, which preserves geological, paleontological and archaeological finds found in the area, as well as a collection of wooden sculptures and toys.
- The Luis Trenker House of Culture, housed in a building designed by the architect Hubert Prachensky (1916–2009), preserves the ancient bell of the Magister Manfredinus.
- The bronze statue of the Roman legionary, sculpted in wood in 1904 by Johann Baptist Moroder and fused in bronze in 2001, in front at Villa Venezia.
- Villa Venezia, home and workshop of the sculptor Johann Baptist Moroder, constructed between 1902 and 1903 following the venetian style of architecture.
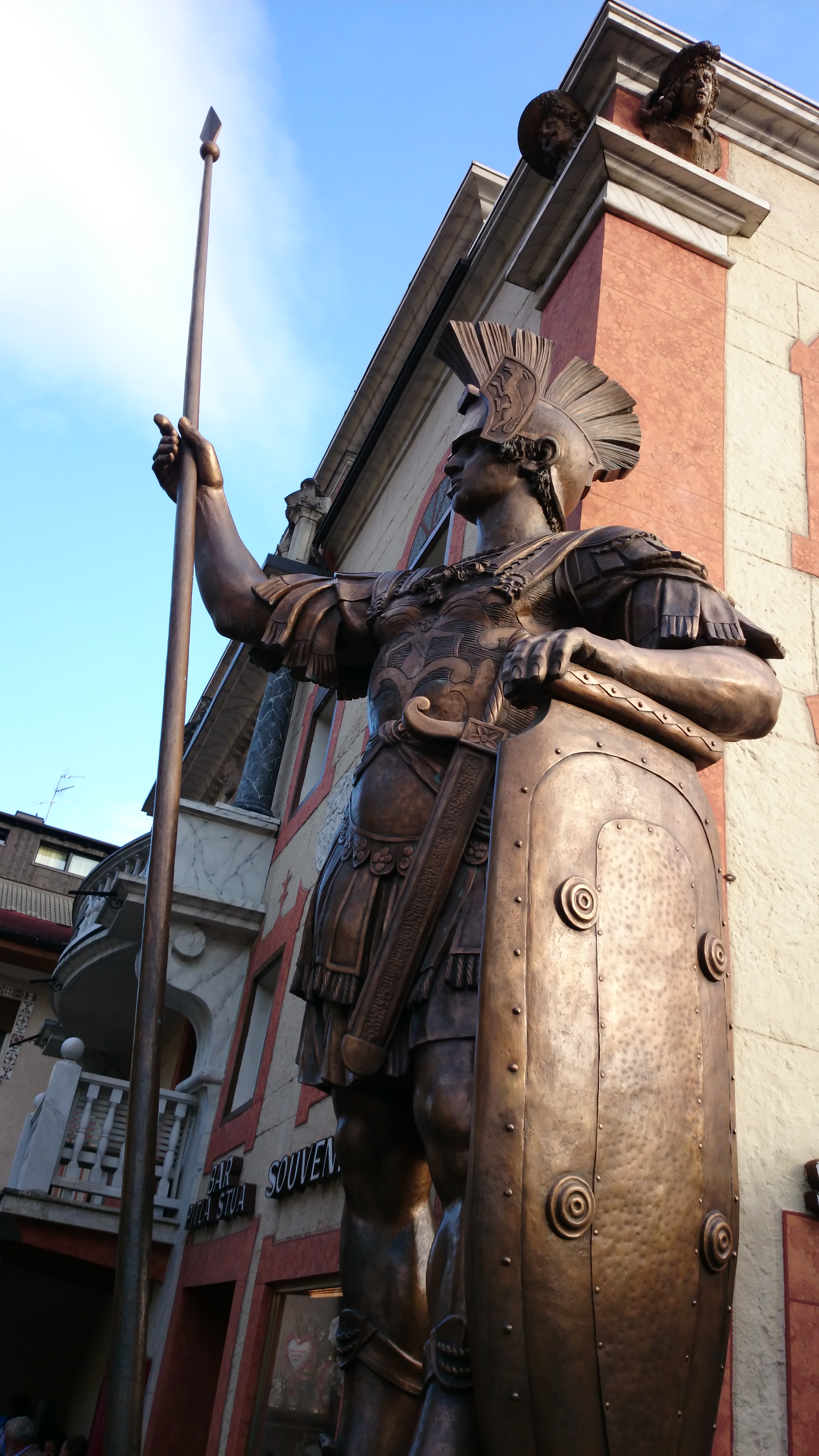
Roman legionary sculpted in wood in 1904 by Johann Baptist Moroder and fused in bronze in 2001.

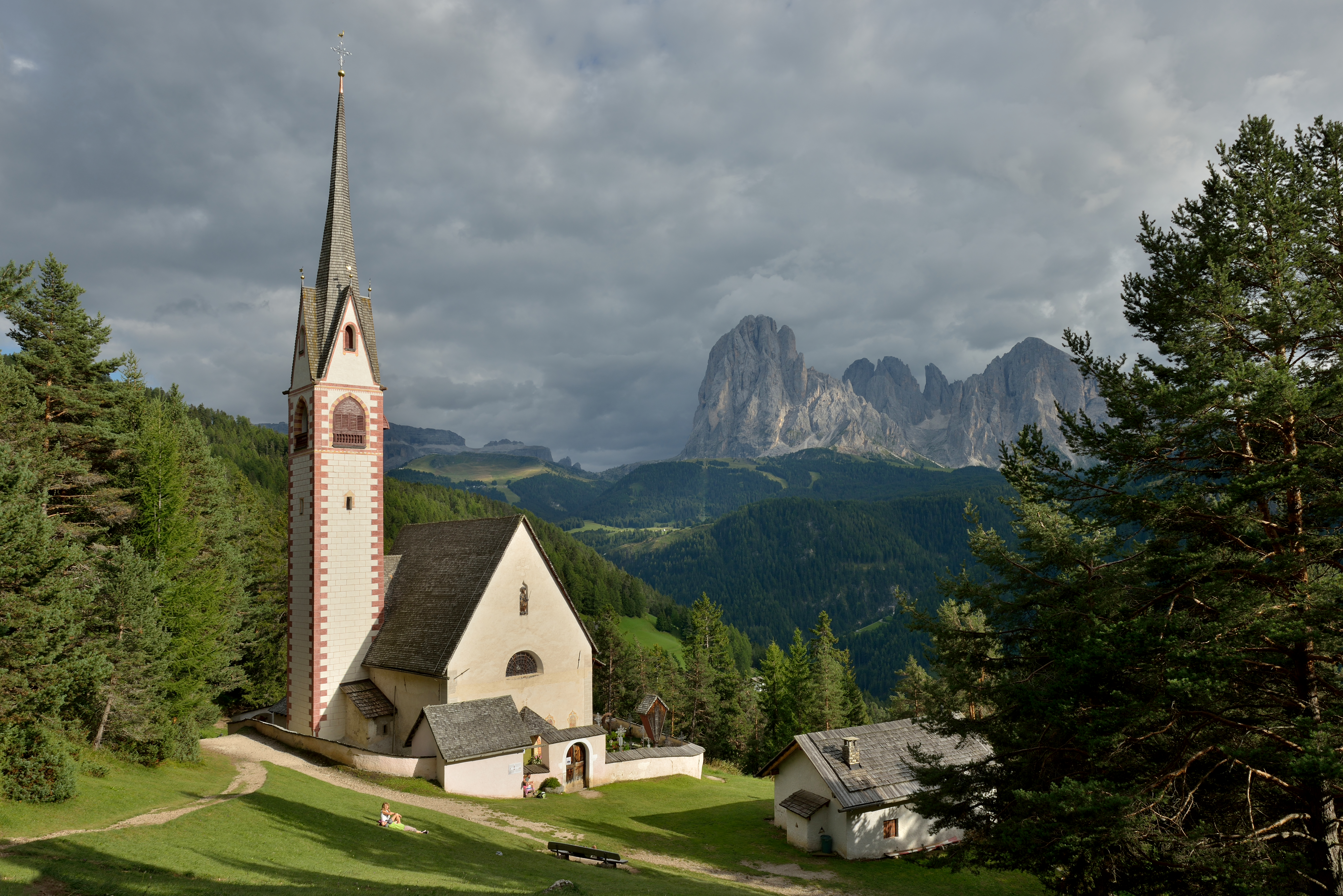
Church of St. Jacob

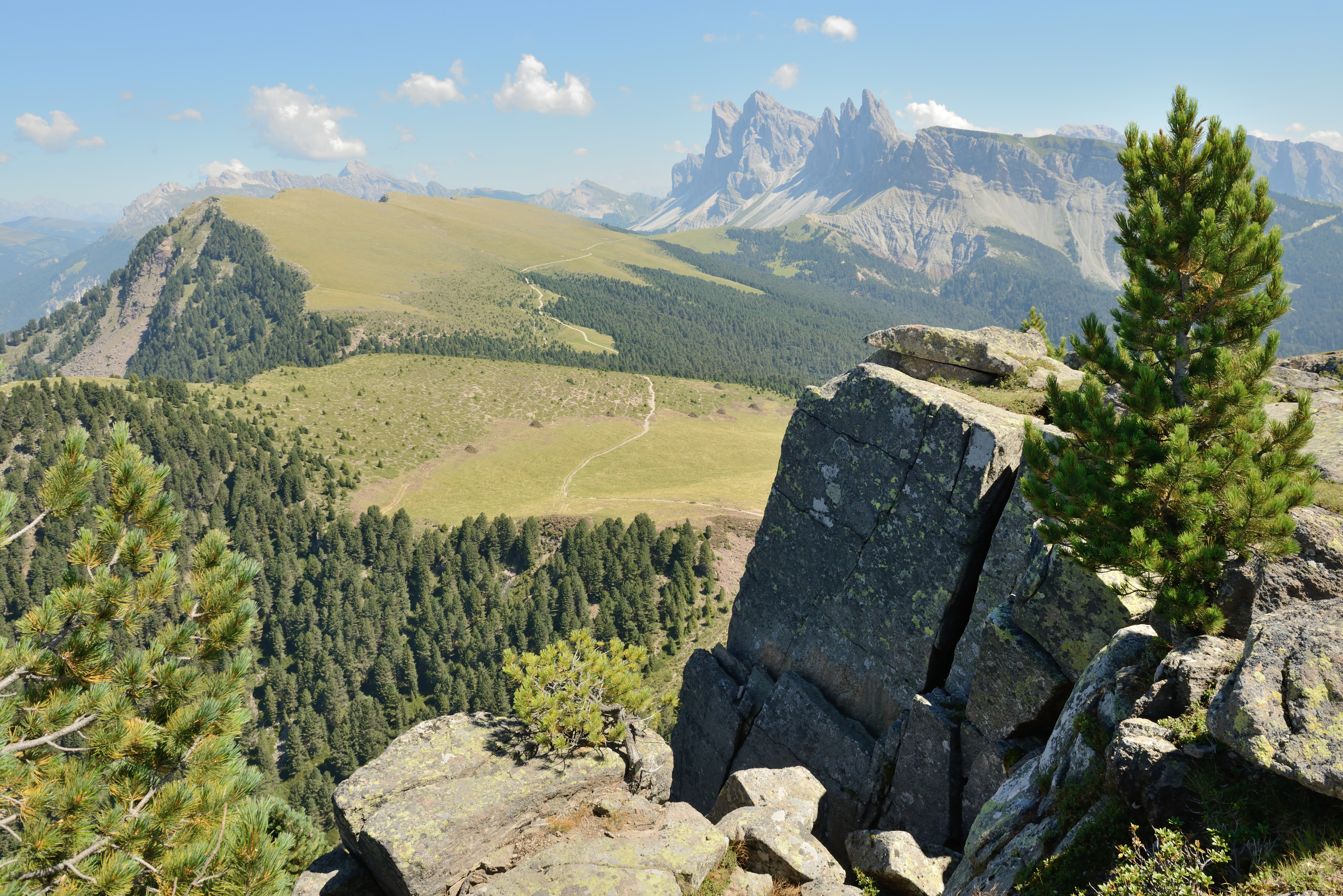
The pasture Resciesa

== Society ==
Urtijëi is, according to the declared affiliations to language groups, a majority Ladin-speaking municipality. The following percentage values are based on valid declarations made by persons holding Italian citizenship.

Distribution according to language group affiliation or assignment declarations
Language	1981	1991	2001	2011	2024
Ladin	84,35 %	83,94 %	82,32 %	84,19 %	79,75 %
German	10,26 %	11,07 %	12,13 %	9,30 %	10,35 %
Italian	5,39 %	4,98 %	5,55 %	6,51 %	9,90 %

== Education ==
Urtijëi is the seat of a school district that jointly administers several schools of the Ladin language group. This includes in Urtijëi the elementary school and the middle school “Ujep Antone Vian,” as well as the elementary school of the neighboring locality of Runggaditsch.

Urtijëi is also home to the only secondary schools in Val Gardena, namely the art high school “Cademia,” the provincial vocational school for arts and crafts, and the business-oriented high school “Raetia.”

Furthermore, Urtijëi has the kindergarten “Saliëta,” a music school, and three libraries: the municipal library “S. Durich,” the Ladin library in the Cësa di Ladins, and the specialized library of the district for art and culture.

== Notable people ==
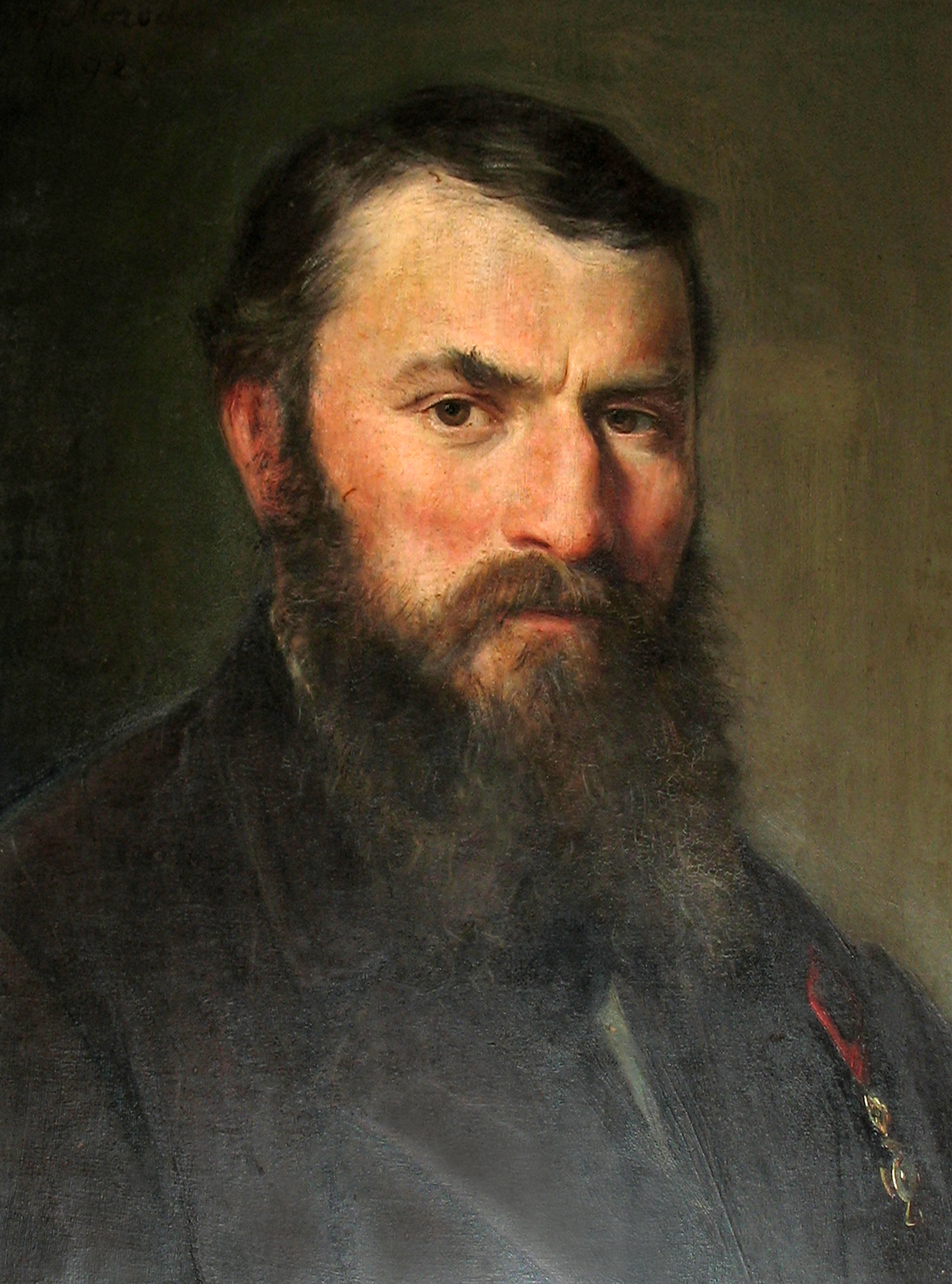
Franz Moroder by J Moroder-Lusenberg

- Luis Trenker (1892–1990), film producer, director, writer, actor, architect, alpinist and bobsledder
- Ernesto Prinoth (1923–1981), racing driver and founder of Prinoth AG
- Isolde Kostner (born 1975), former Alpine skier, medallist at the 1994 and 2002 Winter Olympics
- Carolina Kostner (born 1987), figure skater, lives in Urtijëi

Moroder family

- Josef Moroder-Lusenberg (1846–1939), painter and sculptor
- Franz Moroder (1847–1920), politician and poet, the first mayor of Ortisei
- Johann Baptist Moroder (1870–1932), sculptor
- Rudolf Moroder-Lenèrt (1877–1914), sculptor specializing in religious art
- Ludwig Moroder (1879–1953), sculptor and teacher
- Friedrich (Rico) Moroder (1880–1937), sculptor
- Adele Moroder (1887–1966), author and Ladin language writer
- Otto Moroder (1894–1977), sculptor
- David Moroder (1931–1997), luger and sculptor
- Giorgio Moroder (born 1940), singer, songwriter, DJ and record producer
- Egon Rusina Moroder (born 1949), painter and illustrator, lives in Ortisei
