= Alex Moroder =

Italian author (1923–2006)

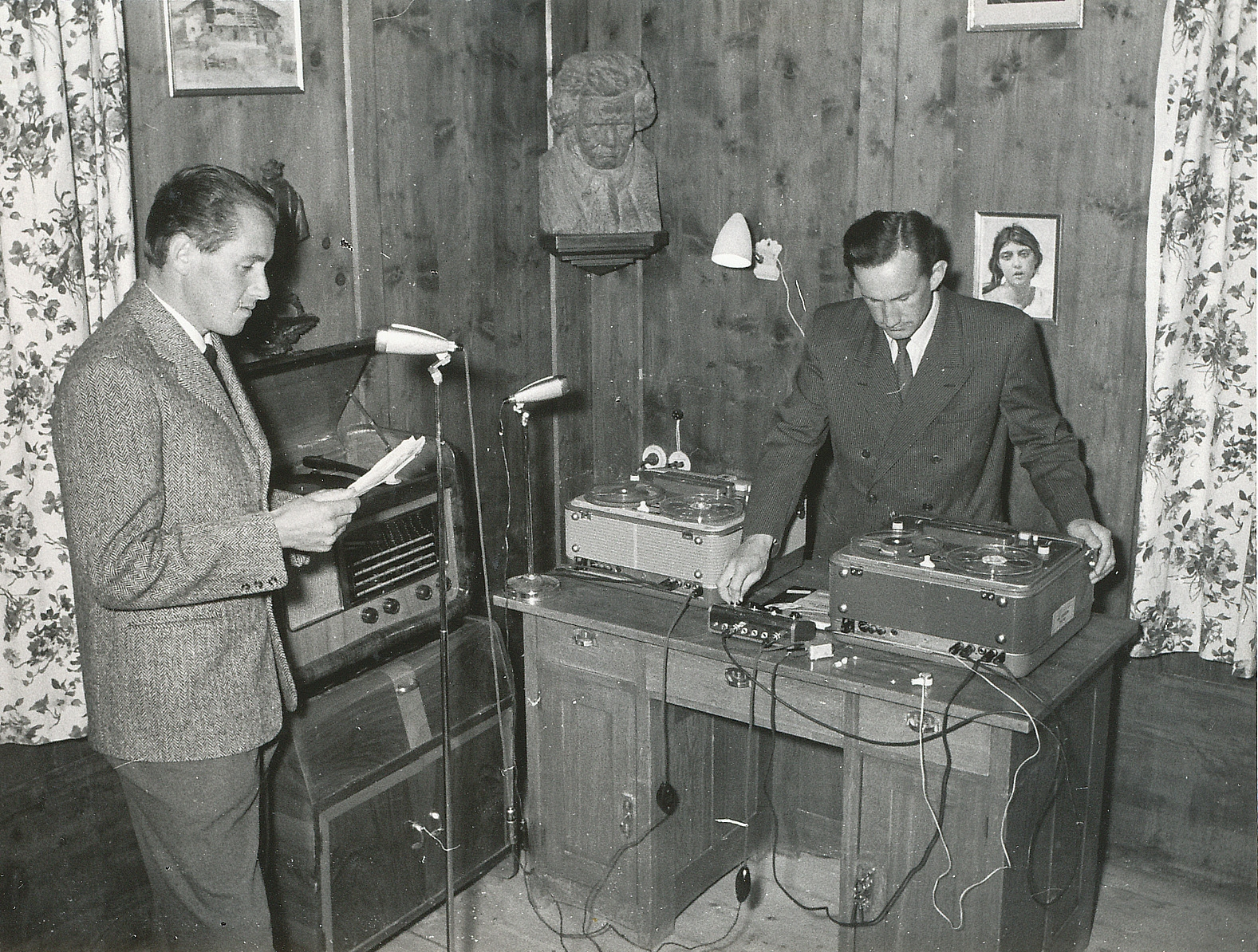
Registration session of Radio Ladin de Gherdëina

Alex Moroder relating on the financial situation of the Union di Ladins de Gherdëina in 1982

Alex Moroder (Ortisei, 13 May 1923 – Ortisei, 11 November 2006) was an Italian activist.

== Biography ==
He was the son of sculptor Ludwig Moroder and Adele Moroder. In 1939, he was enrolled in the Italian army with the Alpini fighting Germany. In September 1943 he was deported in the labour camp of Pomerania and at a later time, he was moved to Carinthia, where he worked in an infirmary and as an interpreter.

In 1945 he married Paola Grossrubatscher and had five children: Ulrike, Wolfgang, Egon, Ruth and Stefan. He died in 2006 due to complications of the hepatitis he contracted in the labour camps.

== Ladinian investment ==
Alex Moroder advocated for the conservation and diffusion of the culture and of the language native to the Ladin people, he actively founded and worked in these associacions:

- Union di Ladins de Gherdëina (1951–2006)
- Secretary of the Union Generela di Ladins dla Dolomites (1975–1987)
- Administrator of the newspaper La Usc di Ladins, a weekly Ladin newspaper distributed in the Dolomites (1974–1994)
- Radio Ladin de Gherdëina (1955–1997)
- Museum de Gherdëina, he was one of the founders alongside Robert Moroder who was the president, Hermann Moroder-Jumbierch, Heinrich Moroder-Doss Raimund Mureda, Luis Piazza and Vigil Prugger. (1958–2006)
- Ladin theatre in Ortisei

He was also part of these other cultural associacions:

- Parochial choir of Ortisei (1941–2006)
- Club Alpino Italiano-Alpenverein Südtirol Val Gardena section, he was a founder alongside Hans Sanoner, Batista Vinatzer, Flavio Pancheri, Norbert Mussner, Heinrich Moroder-Doss and Bruno Moroder
- association for the maintaining of the uses and costumes of Val Gardena (1956–1968)
- Scholastic Patron, president from 1965 to 1985

== Written productions ==
- Lecurdanzes de l'ultima gran Viëra, Calënder de Gherdëina, Union di Ladins de Gherdëina, Ortisei, 1965 (Ladin).
- L fanatism fej uni vierces – fanaticism blinds - interview with Ingrid Runggaldier Usch di Ladins, Ortisei 2006 (Ladin).
- Alongside Edgar Moroder he produced a genealogic tree of his family.

== Radio Ladin ==
Alongside Bruno Moroder in 1955 he founded Radio Ladin de Gherdëina, with the purpose of creating cultural and news-oriented transmissions in the Ladin language that were also transmitted on RAI. The Museum Gherdëina owns over 500 magnetic coils registered by Alex Moroder and his associates during their activities, they were awarded the status of documental patrimony of Alto Adige and named Archivio Radio Ladin Alex Moroder it has now been digitalized and is accessible by the Mediateca of the Autonomous province of Bolzan.

== Honoreficences ==
- Golden lamb of the county of Ortisei, 7 December 1991
- Medal of Honour of Tirol and Innsbruck, 15 August 1999
