= Franz Moroder =

Austrian politician (1947 - 1920)

Franz Moroder Lenèrt (4 September 1847 – 13 May 1920) was an Austrian politician and poet. He was the first mayor of Urtijëi in Val Gardena, a merchant, a scholar of Ladin history as well as a strong promoter of the Ladinian language.

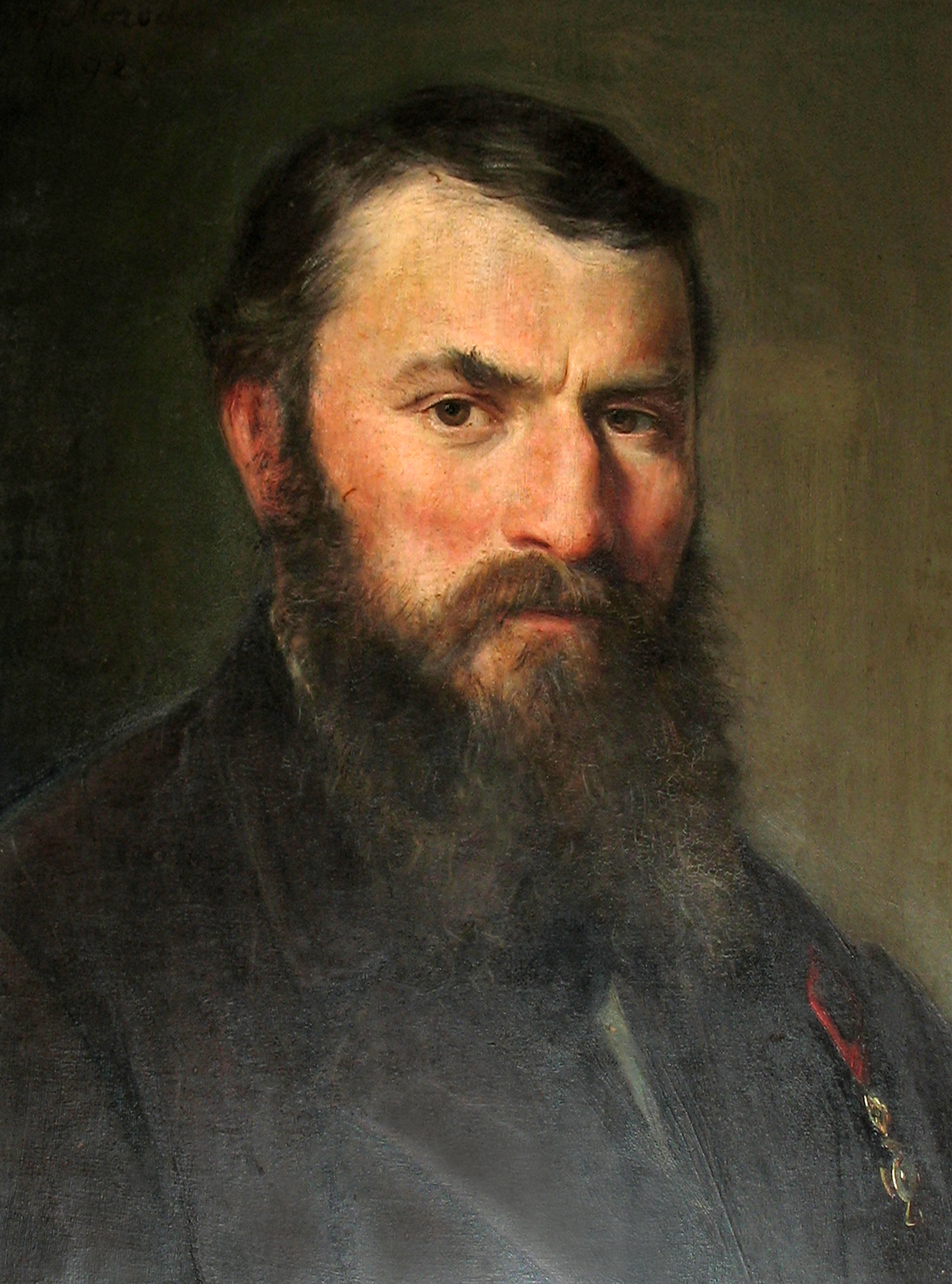
A portrait of Franz Moroder done by his cousin Josef Moroder-Lusenberg

== Biography ==
He was the son of Jan Matie Moroder (1802-1849), a merchant from Ancona operating in Urtijëi, and Marianna Perathoner Lenert. Franz Moroder was educated in Urtijëi, Brixen and Trento, he later worked as a shopkeeper in Trento and Bolzano until he completed his commercial education. He worked with several merchants operating in Val Gardena, Saint Petersburg, London and Paris. Due to his work, he was able to fluently speak both English and French. He translated some poems from English to Ladinian and he also wrote a French translated version of his book titled La Val Gardena. The book was never published and hence only the original manuscript remains today.

In 1875 he married his cousin: Marianna Moroder, who was the daughter of the painter Josef Moroder-Lusenberg. He had 14 children, one of whom was Rudolf Moroder-Lenert. He also had a daughter Adele Moroder, who married a distant relative and famous painter Ludwig Moroder.

Franz Moroder wrote several poems in Ladin and composed some violin ballads that were published in Leipzig.

== Commercial activities ==
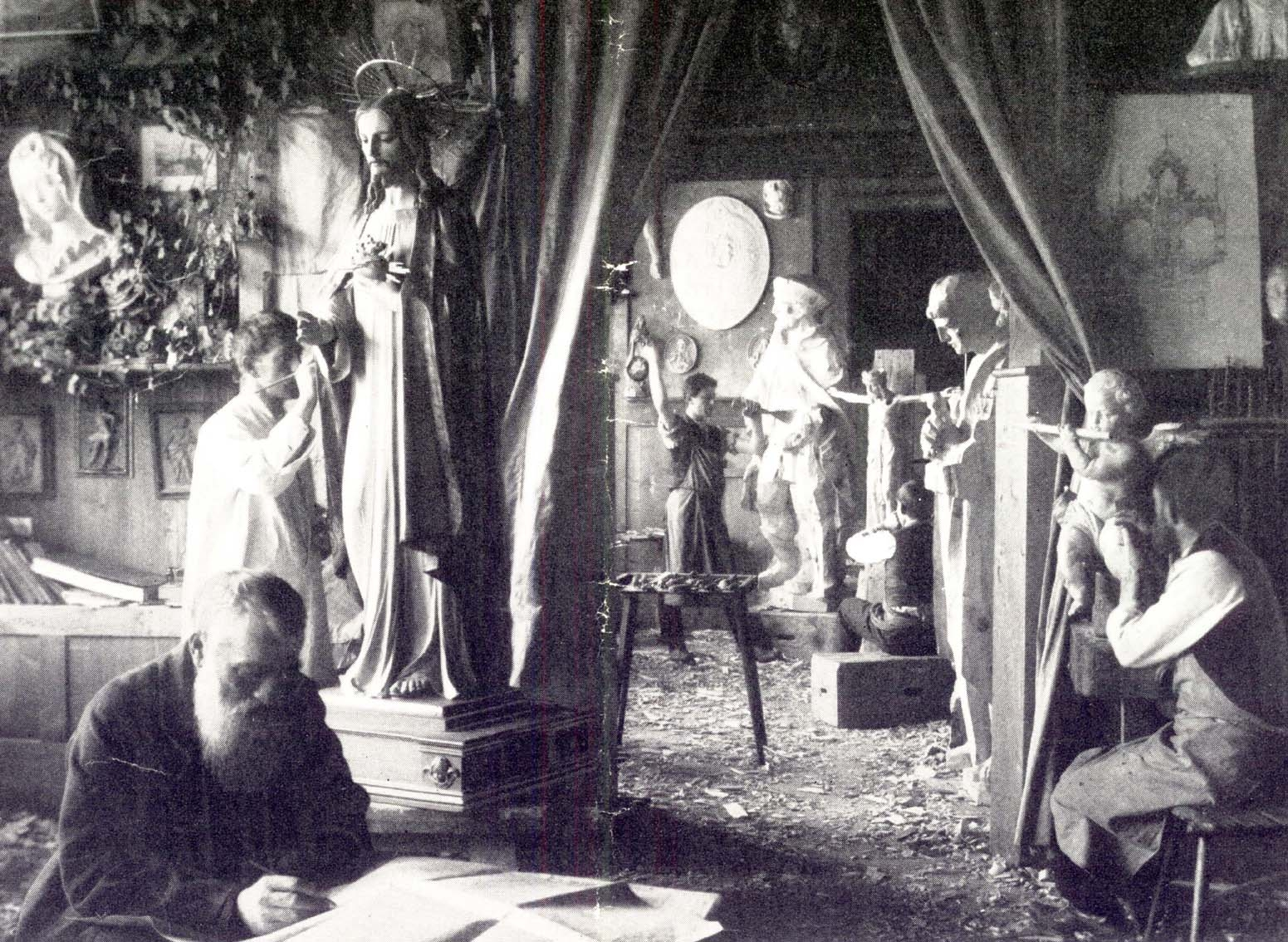
The workshop of the Moroder Brothers firm in Urtijëi. On the left Franz Moroder on the right Ludwig Moroder.

In 1869 Franz Moroder alongside his brother Alois founded the Ditta Fratelli Moroder (literally translatable to: Moroder Brothers firm) to commerce wooden toys and sacred ornaments. The firm also sold sacred ornaments outside of Italy, specifically in Offenburg and Baden-Württemberg, over 40 wood carvers were employed. The firm received several prizes in London at the universal exposition as well as in Paris, Eger, Bolzano, Vienna, Saint Petersburg and Florence.

== Political activities ==
At the age of 25, in 1872 Moroder was elected in the communal committee of Urtijëi. In 1886 he became a member of the house of commerce in Bolzano and was honoured with a gold medal for his services to the city in 1898. In 1895 he co-founded the Val Gardena section of the Austro-German Alpine club. As co-founder of the club he promoted the touristic development of Val-Gardena. In 1895/1896 he helped in the construction of a Mountain hut in the Passo Gardena. In 1902 he became the mayor of Urtijëi and promoted the construction of the first high pressured water system in the town, in the same year he also built some infrastructure near the torrent Cuecenes. In 1909 he was given the cross of merit with a crown by the Austrian Emperor Franz Joseph I of Austria.

In several pamphlets and leaflets, Franz Moroder, alongside Archangelus Lardschneider, Josef Runggaldier and his nephew Wilhelm Moroder, advocated for the use of the Ladinian language, which he frequently used in his poems.
