= Rudolf Moroder-Lenèrt =

Austrian sculptor (1877–1914)

Rudolf Moroder-Lenèrt (26 January 1877 in Urtijëi, County of Tyrol – 22 December 1914 in Radlow, Galicia) was an Austrian sculptor specializing in religious art, who was a member of the Moroder family of South Tyrol, which was notable for the many artists of repute they produced.

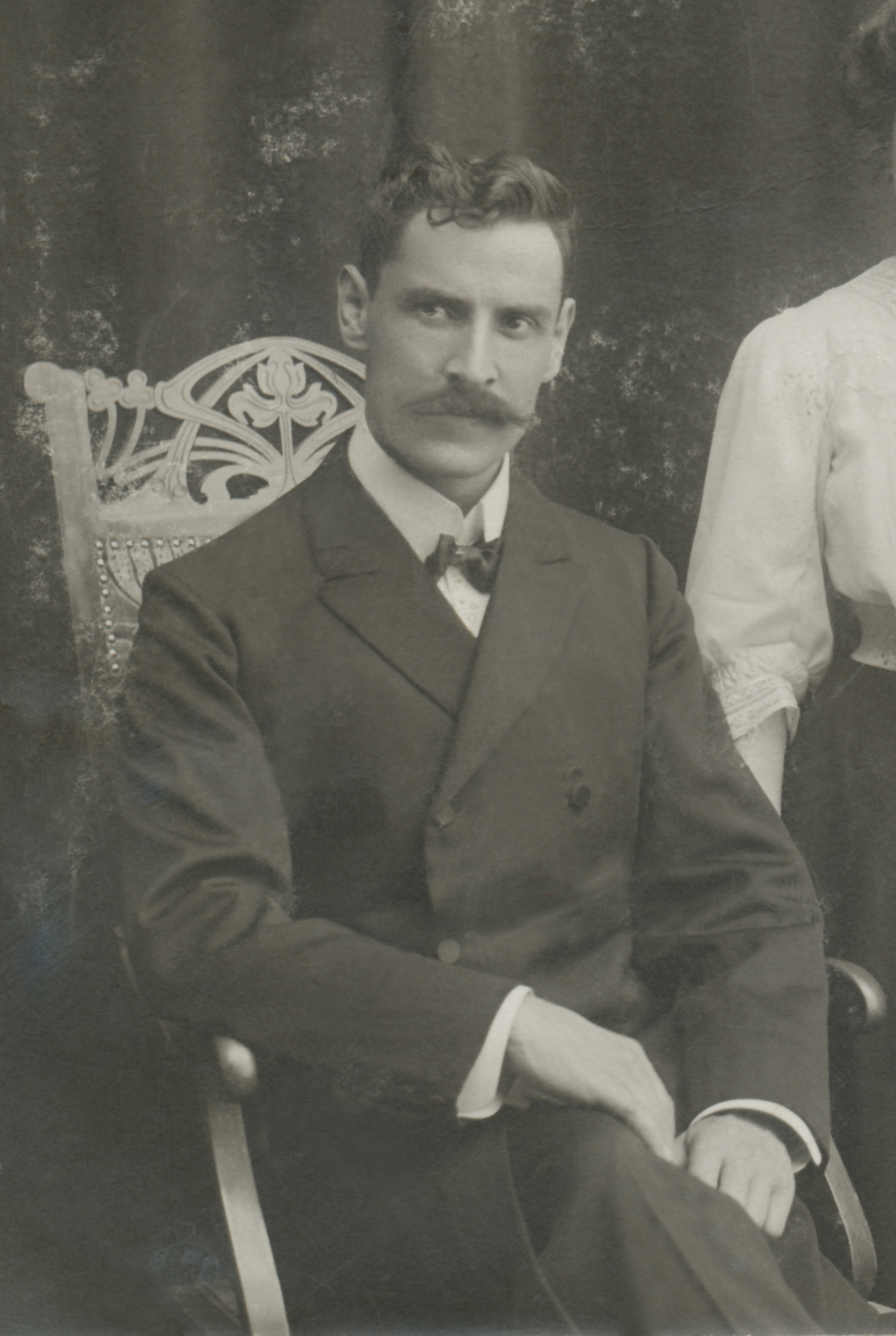
Rudolf Moroder-Lenèrt in 1905

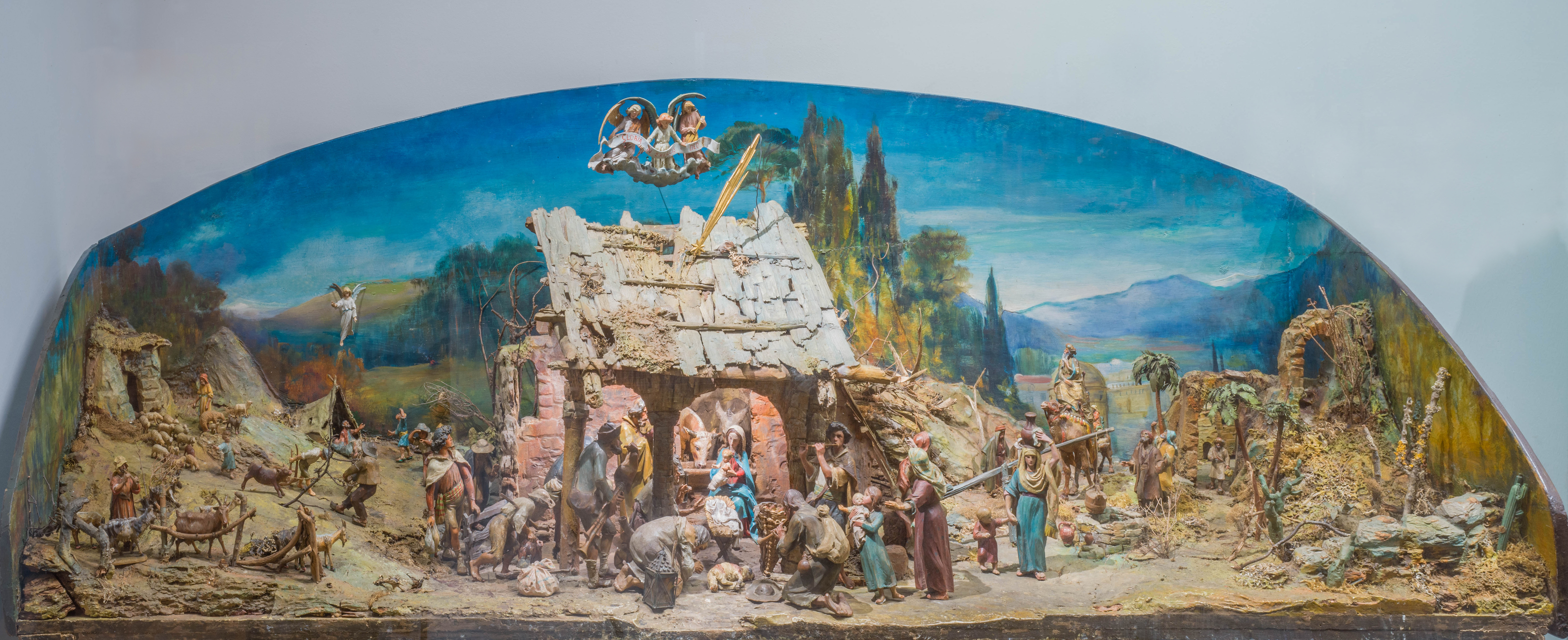
Nativity carved by Rudolf Moroder and painted by Josef Moroder-Lusenberg exposed at the Museum Gherdëina in Urtijëi.

== Life ==
Rudolph was the son of Franz Moroder-Lenèrt, a leading politician of the region, and of Marianna Moroder-Lusenberg, the sister of the noted sculptor Josef Moroder-Lusenberg. During a period of military service in the Austro-Hungarian Army in Vienna, he recognized that his true interest was in being an artist. He began his training in the craft under Anton Runggaldier (known as "Tone da Passua") and then became an assistant in the studio of Franz Tavella.

In 1902 Moroder opened his own studio in Lenèrt House, home of the firm, Moroder Brothers, where his brother-in-law, Ludwig Moroder, also worked. His own works ranged across a number of religious themes, and were mostly created for the various churches and cathedrals of the Grand Duchy of Baden and the Kingdom of Württemberg. He created a famous set of the Stations of the Cross for the Church of St. Ann in Silesia.

Moroder re-entered military service when World War I broke out. Stationed at a base in Radlow in Austrian Galicia, he was there when the position was overrun by enemy forces. He, along with many of his comrades, was bayonetted to death, dying at the age of 37. His body was buried there.

== Works ==
Moroder decided to submit a work to an art exhibit at the World's Fair of 1900, to be held in Paris. He chose his wooden sculpture of St. Elizabeth of Hungary with a Beggar, which he had sculpted in 1898 at the age of 21, based on a design by Christian Delago. He won the gold medal in the exhibition for this piece. The work is now in the Rosary Chapel of the parish church of Urtijëi, known for the large number of significant works of art from that period created by the large, local artistic community of the region.

Another of Moroder's pieces, a large, wooden sculpture of Saint Peter, stands in the sanctuary of the church, next to the main altar.

== Gallery ==
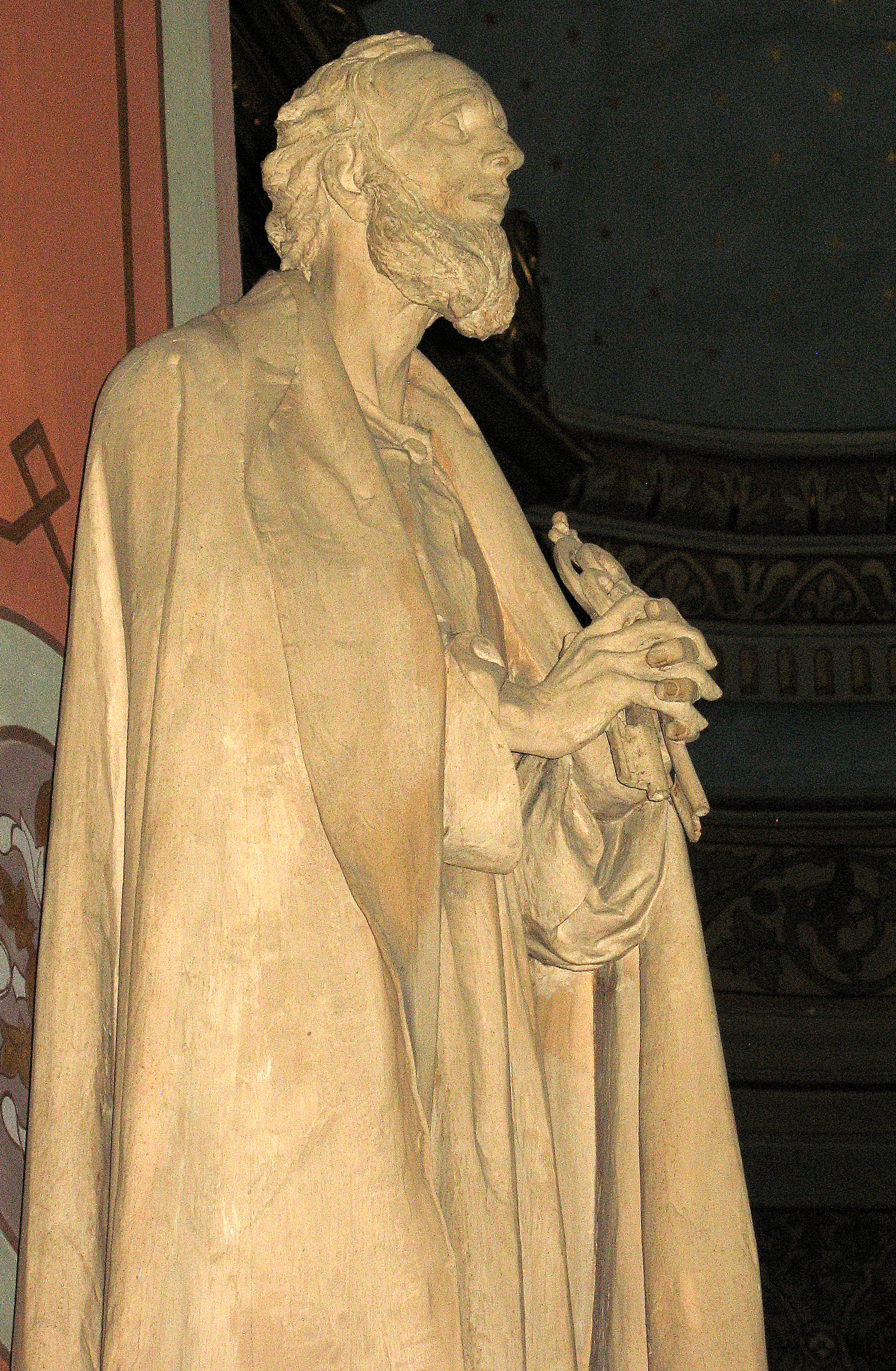
A statue of Saint Peter, carved in wood (1907), in the parish church of Urtijëi

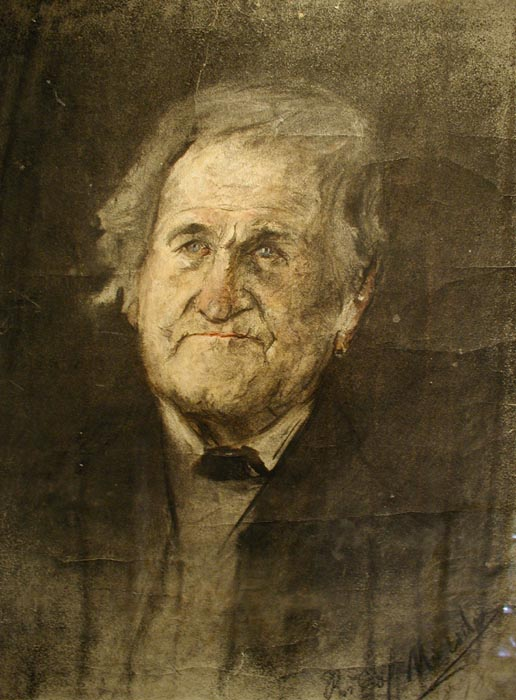
A portrait by Moroder

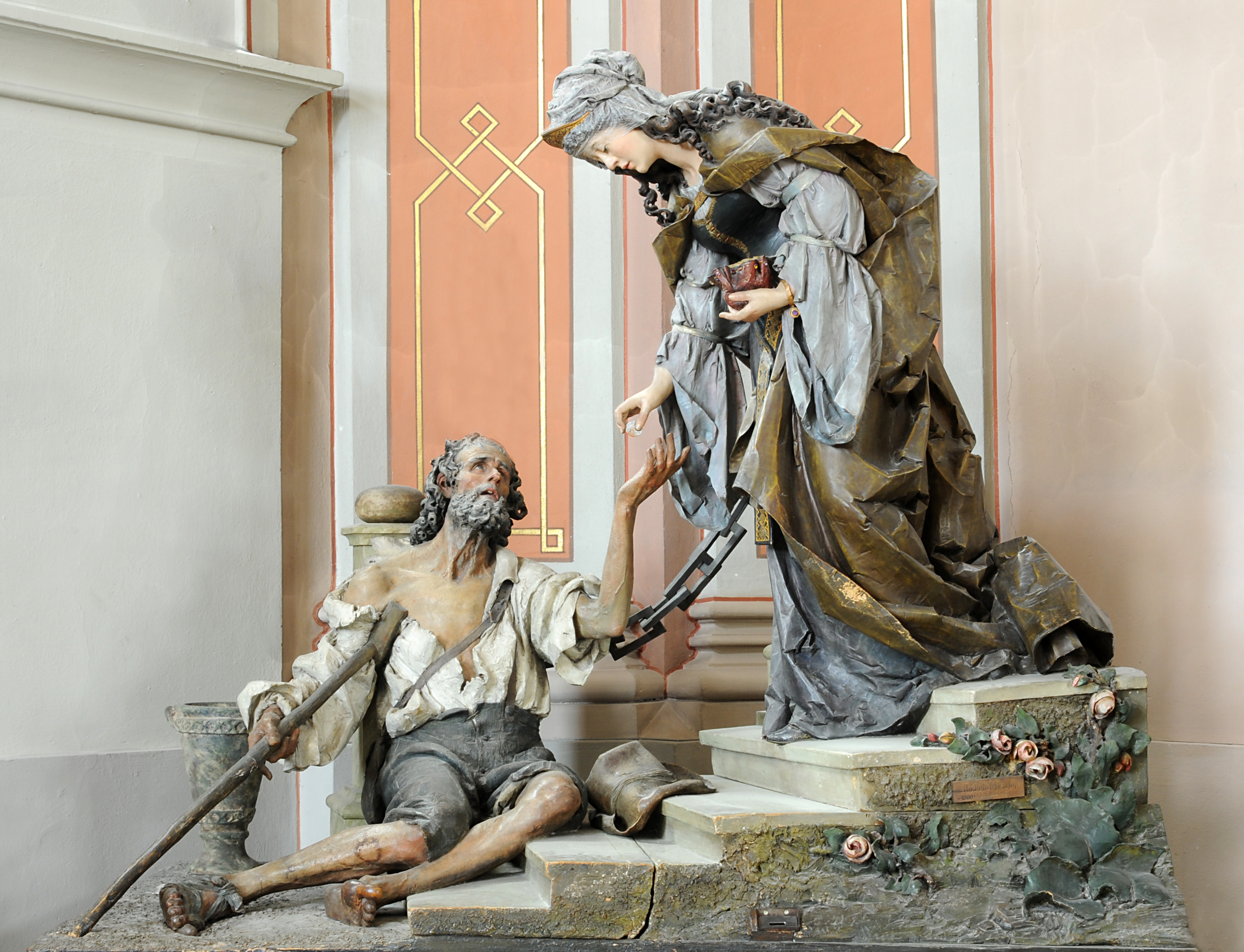
St. Elizabeth of Hungary with a Beggar (1898)
in wood, in the parish church of Urtijëi

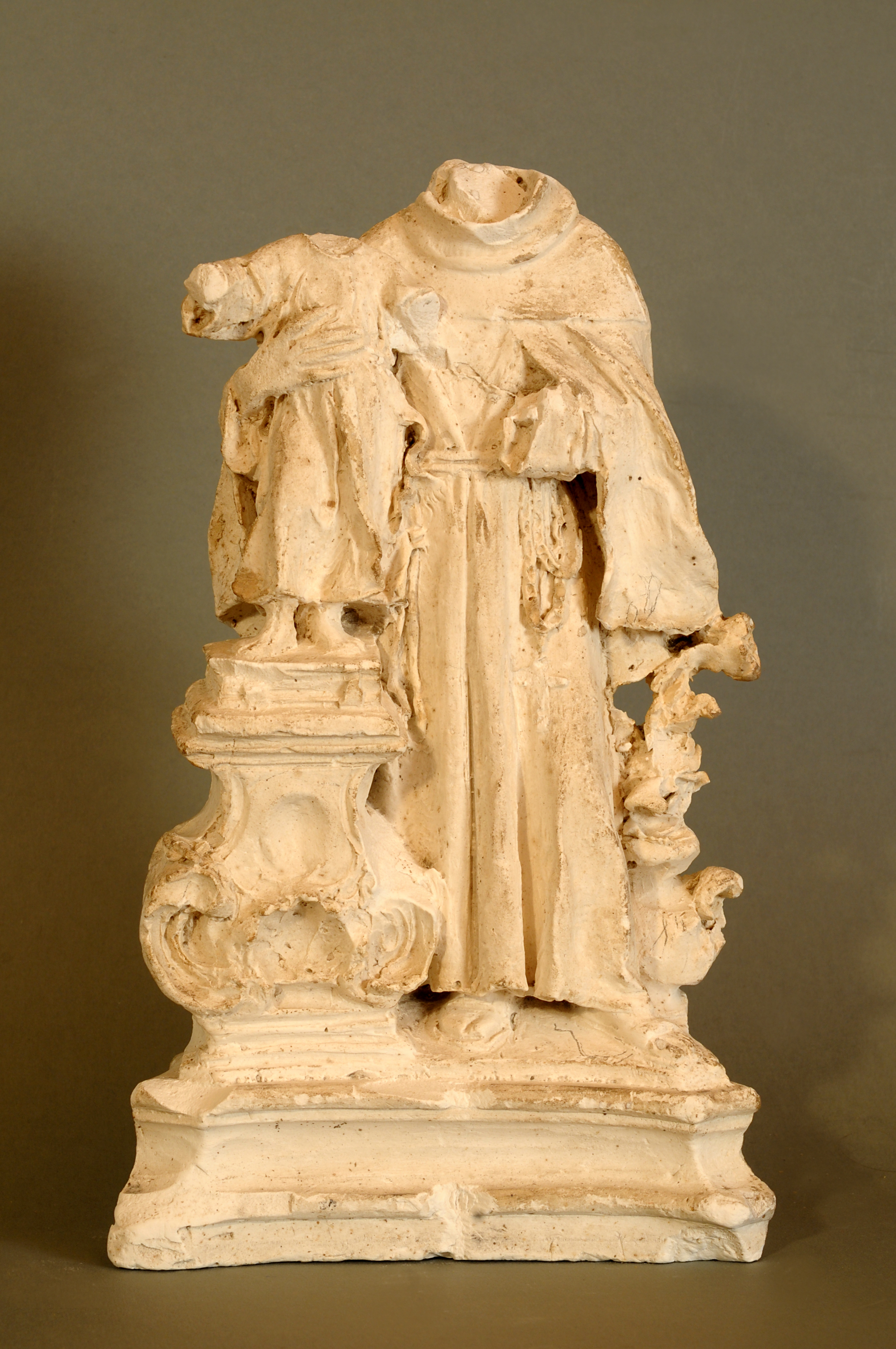
St. Anthony of Padua with the Infant Jesus
(plaster cast)

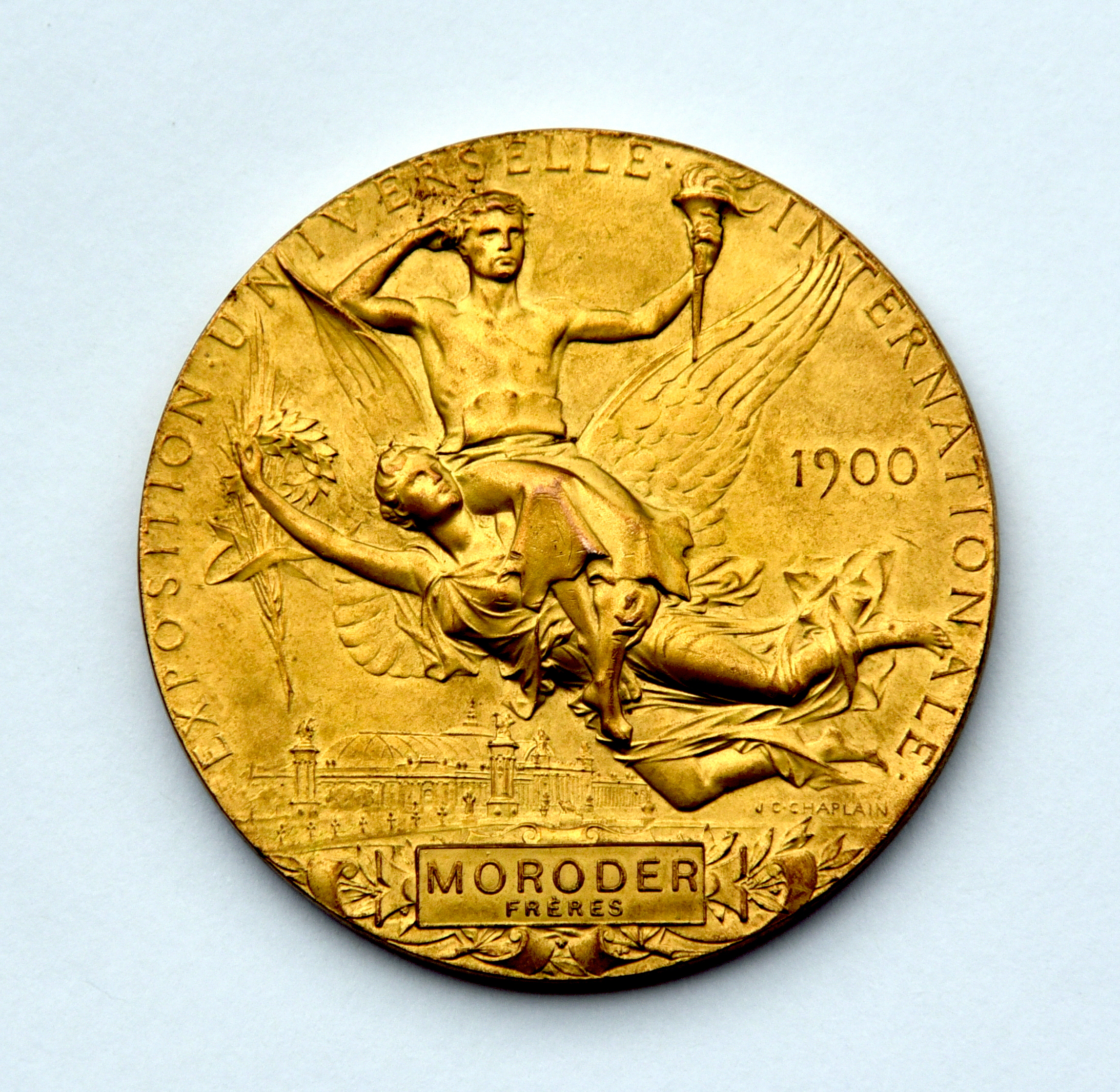
Gold Medal awarded to Rudolf Moroder for the sculpture Saint Elisabeth with beggar at the World's Fair of 1900 in Paris

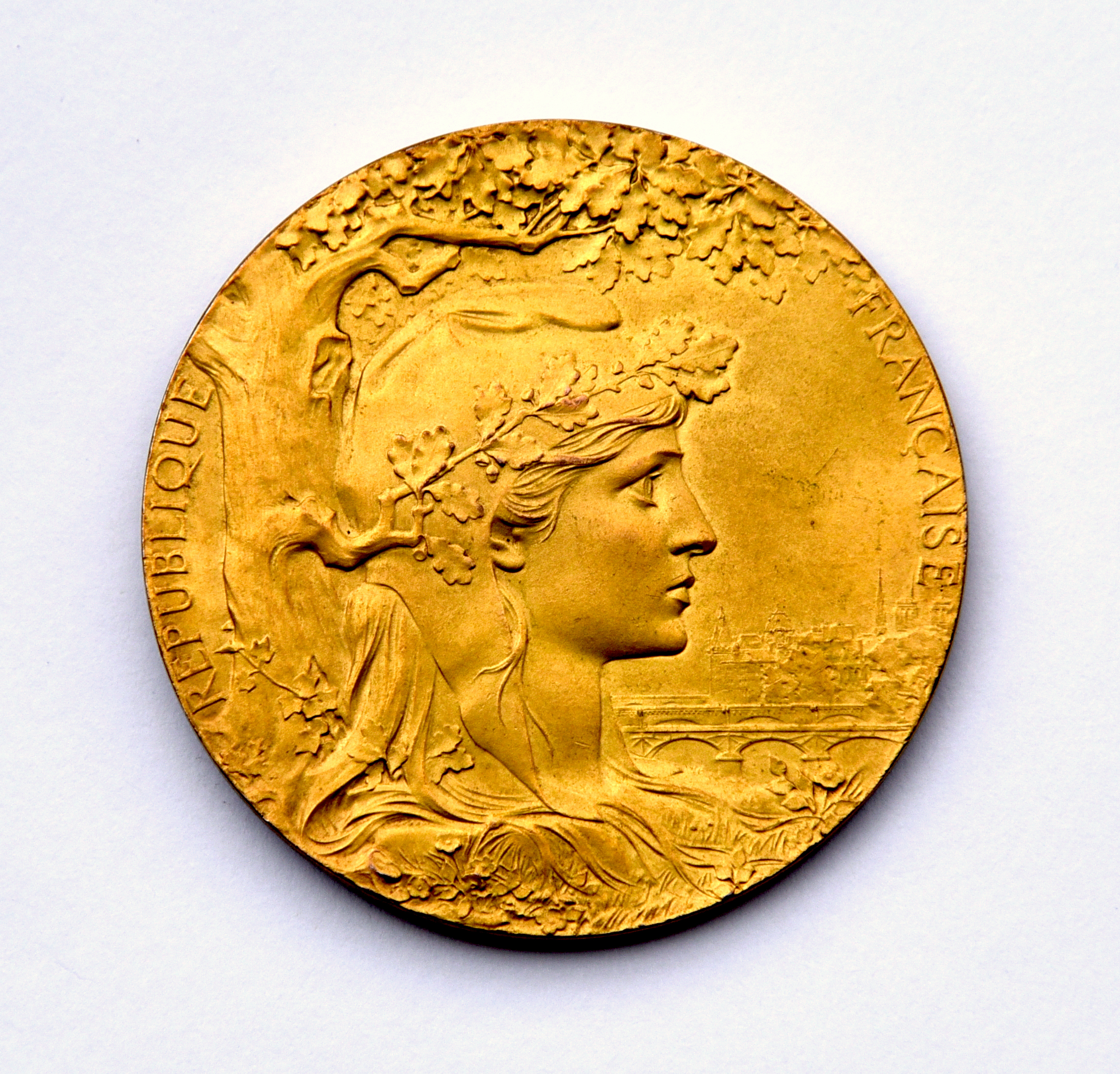
Reverse of the gold medal

== Sources ==
- CM (Christian Moroder): N lecord dl scultëur Rudolf Moroder de Lenert 80 ani do si mort. Calënder de Gherdëina 1994, Union di Ladins de Gherdëina, St. Ulrich 1993. pages 16–38. (sources of the images) (Ladin)
- Edgar Moroder: Die Moroder, Ein altladinisches Geschlecht aus Gröden-Dolomiten. Vom 14. bis zum 20. Jahrhundert. Ursprung – Geschichte – Biographien – Anhang. Beitrag zur tirolischen Familienforschung. Eigenverlag St. Ulrich in Gröden 1980, pages 246–249. (German)
- Adele Moroder de Lenèrt: 'N memoria de Rudolf Moroder de Lenert do 50 ani che 'l i.e. tumà tla gran viëra mondiela 1914. Calënder de Gherdëina 1965, Union di Ladins de Gherdëina, St. Ulrich 1964. pages 29-31. (Ladin)
- Cirillo Dell’Antonio: Artisti ladini 1580–1939. Cristiano Trebinger, Melchiore Vinazer, Domenico Moling, Valentino Rovisi, Domenico Mahlknecht, G. Battista Pettena, Ferdinando Demetz, G. Battista Chiocchetti, Francesco Tavella, G. Moroder-Lusenberg, Giuseppe Iellico, Rodolfo Moroder. Trento. Ed. della Scuola D'Arte. 1951. (in Italian)

== Literature ==
- E. Egg: "Moroder(-Lenert) Rudolf". In: Österreichisches Biographisches Lexikon 1815–1950 (ÖBL). Vol. 6, Austrian Academy of Sciences, Vienna 1975, ISBN 3-7001-0128-7, p. 377.
