= Adele Moroder =

Austrian writer

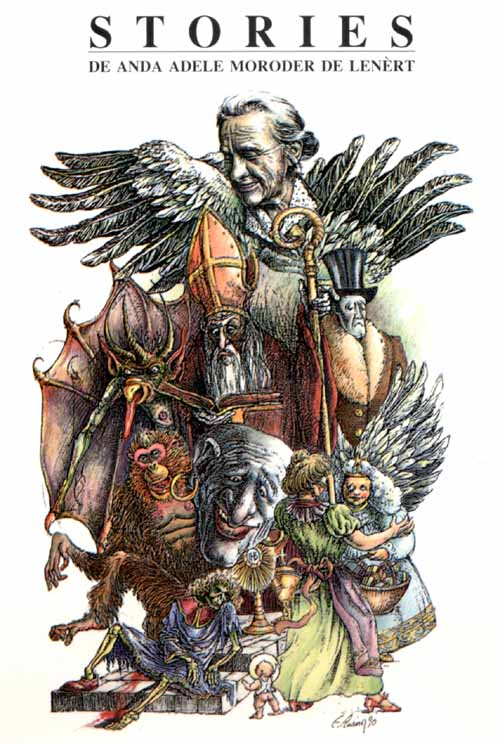
Adele Moroder's book cover - designed by Egon Rusina Moroder

Adele Moroder-Lenèrt (Ortisei (now Urtijëi), 17 December 1887 – Ortisei, 11 February 1966) was an Austrian author who spent a considerable part of her life in Italy. She exclusively wrote in Ladin.

== Biography ==
She was the daughter of Franz Moroder and married her cousin, the sculptor Ludwig Moroder. She published many old tales and legends in Ladin with the help of the newspaper “Nos Ladins” and “Calender de Gherdeina”. She read her most well known 70 tales on the Italian national TV channel RAI. she had a son named Alex Moroder.

The life of the elders
Adele Moroder narrates in Ladin her own grandparent's lives: Vinzanz Moroder and Moidl dl Pech living in the maso Scurcià

== Publications ==
- Calender de Gherdeina. Union di Ladins de Gherdeina, Ortisei year 1959/pag. 68; year 1962/pag. 42; year 1963/pagg. 37, 53, 62; year 1964/pagg. 2-26, 54; year 1965/pagg. 81; year 1966/pagg. 41, 97, 98 (in Ladin).
- Stories de Anda Adele Moroder de Lenèrt. with 7 Illustrations made by Egon Rusina Moroder. Editor: Union di Ladins de Gherdeina, Ortisei 1990 (in Ladin).
- Archive of Radio Ladin de Gherdeina. Museum of Val Gardena, Ortisei.
- Stories de Anda Adele Moroder de Lenèrt (Geschichten von Adele Moroder) (= Moroder de Lenèrt 1990: 61 Geschichten mit sieben Illustrationen von Egon Moroder Rusina. Bei einigen Geschichten handelt es sich um Übersetzungen aus dem Deutschen, vgl. Usc 5.4.2003, 9). Enthält u. a.: 1990
- Co che mi oma cuntova dl nëine y l’ava da Scurcià (Was meine Mutter über den Großvater und die Großmutter vom Scurciàhof erzählte) (S. 11 – 12). Bereits in: CdG 1963, 53 – 55; Moroder 1980, 275; als La vita da zacan (Das damalige Leben) ebenso in: Usc 5.4.2003, 9.1961
- La nevicia da ardimënt (Die mutige Braut) (S. 15 – 16). Als La nevicia da curagio bereits in CdG 1965, 81 – 83. 1965
- La bolp y l lëuf (storia per tei pitli) (Der Fuchs und der Wolf – für die Kleinen) (S. 17 – 18). Bereits in: CdG 1964, 58 – 59. 1964:
- L gial da mont (Der Auerhahn) (S. 19). Bereits in: CdG 1964, 54 – 55. 1964:
- Chiche se auza massa, toma sot (Wer zu hoch hinaus will, fällt tief: Übersetzung) (S. 20 – 22). Bereits in: CdG 1963, 62 – 65. 1963
- Zacan, canche univa San Miculau (Als früher der Hl. Nikolaus kam) (S. 24). Bereits in: NL 1.12.1965, 3; ebenso in: Bel sarëinn 1995, 28 – 29. 1962:
- N cuer misericurdiëus (Ein gütiges Herz) (S. 34 – 37). Bereits in: NL 15.5.1962, 6 – 7 (1. Teil), NL 1.6.1962, 8 (2. Teil), NL 15.6.1962, 7 (3. Teil). 1962:
- L giubileo dla noza dl professëur spensierà (Das Hochzeitsjubiläum des zerstreuten Professors) (S. 38 – 39). Bereits in: CdG 1963, 37 – 39. 1963:
- Amor sëura la fòssa ora! (Liebe über das Grab hinweg!) (S. 40 – 43).50 1963:
- L sotsëura de Marghëta (Das Durcheinander von Marghëta) (S. 58 – 60). Bereits in: CdG 1966, 41 – 44. 1966:
- Usanzes da zacan de uni mëns dl’ann (per 60 – 70 ani) (Alte Bräuche – Monat für Monat) (S. 80 – 83). Bereits in: CdG 1964, 2 – 26. 1964:
