= Egon Rusina Moroder =

Italian painter

Egon Rusina Moroder (born 15 July 1949 in Urtijëi, Val Gardena) is an Italian painter and illustrator from South Tyrol. He lives with his wife and daughter in Urtijëi.

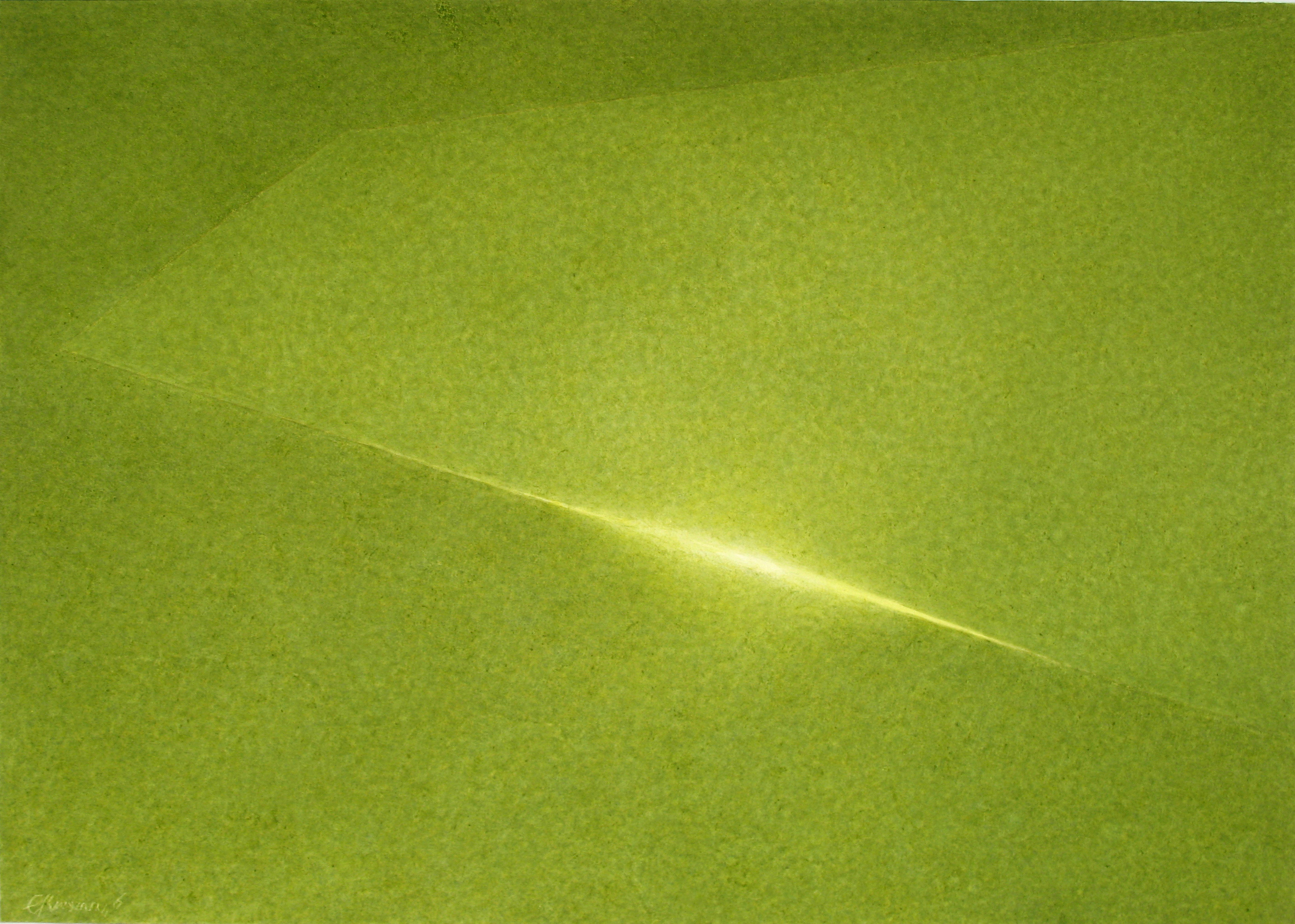
Egon Moroder Rusina from the series "Samsara Niflheim" - gouache on paper

== Education ==
After finishing secondary school in 1964, he learned woodcarving in a workshop in Val Gardena. At the same time, he attended the art school in Urtijëi, where he studied drawing under Markus Vallazza. Between 1967 and 1968 he studied art in Florence and also participated in the student movement 1968/69. During this period of his life, he developed a strong political-social commitment.

== Brixner middle school ==
From 1969 to 1973 he taught as an art teacher at the Brixen middle school and at the same time participated in the "circle for art and culture (Circolo)" in Urtijëi, he is currently still active in this organization. At this time his first experimental exhibitions started: in August 1970 he experimented with cybernetics in the exhibition space of the Circolo; A play of lights made of discontinuous movements of undefined objects in combination with electronic music should give the visitor a feeling of unrest. In August 1971 he built a 15 meters long and 2 meters high hedgehog installation. At the same time, he dealt with his community's political satire by drawing and distributing posters and leaflets. In 1973 he quit his apprenticeship and travelled to Munich living there for a year as a draftsman.

== Homeland mountain and slaughterhouse ==
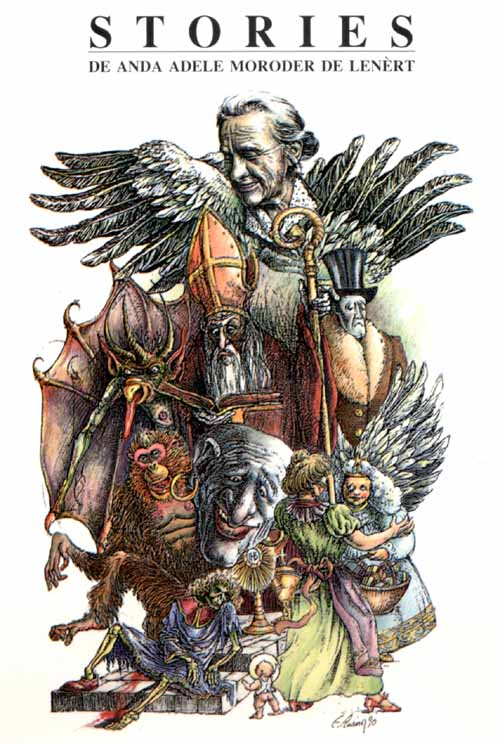
Title drawing for the narrative book by Adele Moroder

From 1975 to 1979 he worked on the theme of "Meat, Blood and Bone, Life and Death" in various drawings and paintings that were created in the mountains and in a slaughterhouse. He sometimes used blood as a dye and for the first time used the fingers instead of the brush. "The Great Luck" by Albrecht Dürer inspired a series of bizarre pictures.

== Sociocritical Realism ==
He vowed to entertain the public with performances and caricatures of political-sociocritical nature. In collaboration with other artists from South Tyrol, exhibitions were created in Bolzano ( Pavilion De Fleur ), Merano ( Town Hall Gallery ) and Bressanone ( Palais Palfi ). His works have been shown in Vienna ( Bevilacqua La Masa ), Venice ( Gallery Aleph ) and Milan ( Gallery Piccinini-Cortina ). At that time he drew caricatures for South Tyrolean newspapers in German, Italian and Ladin, some of which were: Usc di Ladins, Alto Adige, FF-Illustrierte, Skolast, South Tyrolean Arbeiterzeitung, Alternative (KPI), Diving and Thistle.

In a collective exhibition in 1983 at Schloss Prösels near Fiè allo Sciliar, his witch-burning installation was thrown into a cellar and cut down because of its disturbing nature. Due to a video installation, Rusina was accused by the prosecutor of defaming the state religion and obscenity, he was later absolved by an examining magistrate.

== Cartoons and Cards ==
The Watten-Spielkarten (a card game popular in Tyrol and Germany) series of painted cards was produced under Rusina's supervision; the cards had traditional South Tyrolean subjects (30,000 copies were produced) the sales were very successful. In 1997 he printed a book called Viecherei, a collection of over 80 cartoons and caricatures. Another Wadden playing card series "Prominent Women" was published in 2002. Caricatures of South Tyrolean women were immortalized in a provocative way on playing cards. A third satirical version of the Wadden playing cards was released in November 2009 with world and local South Tyrolean celebrities.

== Fantastic Realism ==
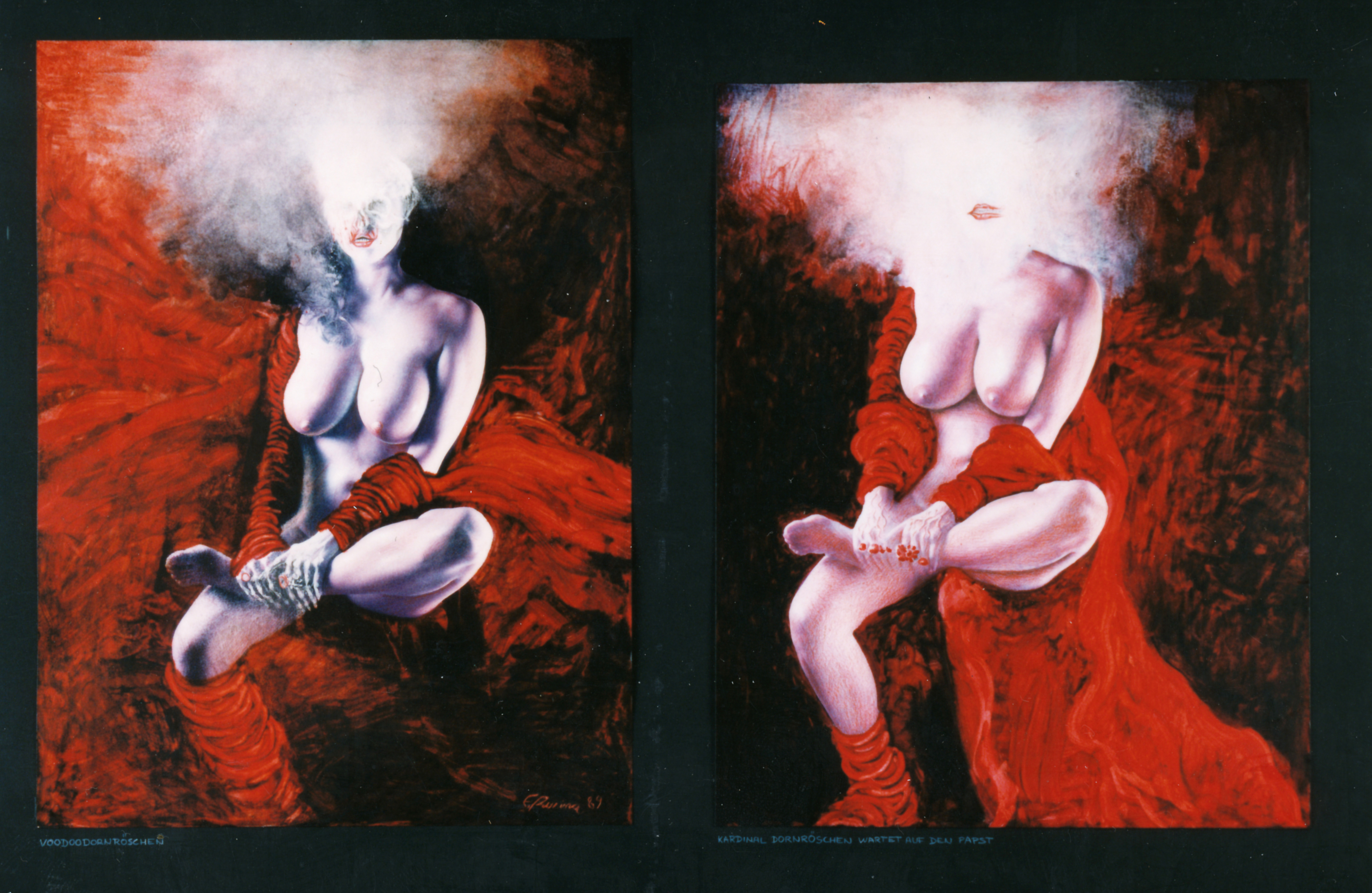
Pictures from the "Dornrößchen" cycle (1986–1993)

For the first time in 1991 Rusina exhibits his mountain pictures in South Tyrol. in 1994 Rusina shows his most famous masterpiece: The white deer in the circle for art and culture in -Urtijëi. Rusina completed his work in the style of Fantastic Realism with the presentation of the Nemesis series at the Art Forum Gallery in Merano in 1999.

== Heart of stone ==
From the year 2000 Rusina started to only paint in the mountains, mostly the Raschötzer Alm. He worked on two projects: the winter theme and a summer counterpart. Rusina at that time gave his production the name of heart made of stone, in order to express his feeling for nature in the title of the same exhibition. Rusina also presented a large wall with a cycle of rock painting.

== Dissolution in nature ==
For fifteen years Rusina lived in the mountains at an altitude of about 2000 meters in the forest. Far away from civilization, with only a small tent serving as his refuge, which he shares with three goats and a few hens. In 2003 he created a painting representing the smoke trails of planes in the sky of the Dolomites. Ever since 2004 Rusina has dedicated his life on the study of Samsara - Niflheim.

== Artistic Motives ==
The work of the artist Rusina is characterized by discomfort in the society of South Tyrol and at the same time by the attraction of his Ladin homeland and mountains. It experienced a continuous change of the form and the aesthetic expressiveness. From the satire, the caricature or the cartoon and fantastic realism, his work came to monochrome painting, which, according to Rusina, represents the calm, death and infinity of nature. The "nothing" or the "emptiness" - so called by Rusina himself - are to find expression in his last works.

== Exhibitions ==
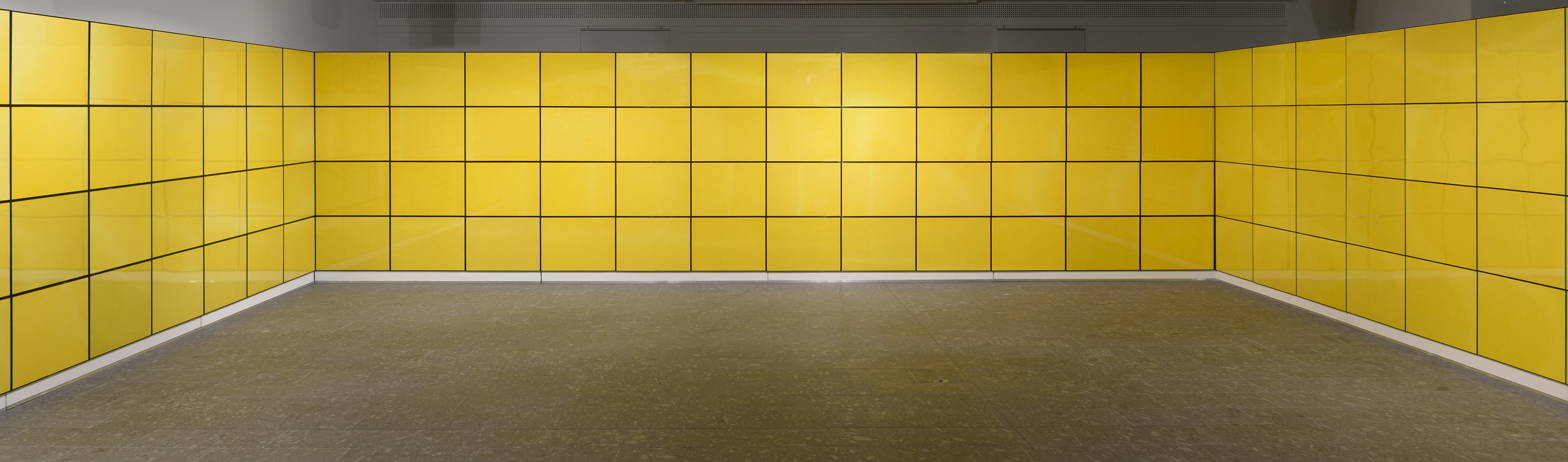
Exhibition Ghialar 2016

- In 1993 in the city museum Klausen the erotic cycle "Dornrößchen" was presented to the public.
- "And the mountain became flesh" was the name of the exhibition, which was commissioned by the State Cultural Assessor. Bruno Hosp was opened in 1991 in St. Magdalena in Villnöss.
- Rusina's political caricatures were shown in various South Tyrolean villages (Bolzano, Vipiteno, Vilpian) between 1995 and 1997.
- In the old tunnel of the then Gardena (built in 1917) he exhibited in October 2000 the cycle resolution.
- In August 2007 the creation Aura in Aere was presented in a group exhibition at the Grand Hotel Dobbiaco.
- The Museum Ladin Ćiastel de Tor in Gadertal in the spring of 2007 honored the artist with the total cycles Samsara-Niflheim (2006–2008) and The Yellow Void (2008–2011).
- The absolute sleep in the city gallery Bressanone, Great Lauben, Bressanone 2010.
- Ghialar at Istitut Ladin Micurá de Rü, St. Martin in Thurn, 2016.
