= Museum Gherdëina =

Museum in Urtijëi, Italy

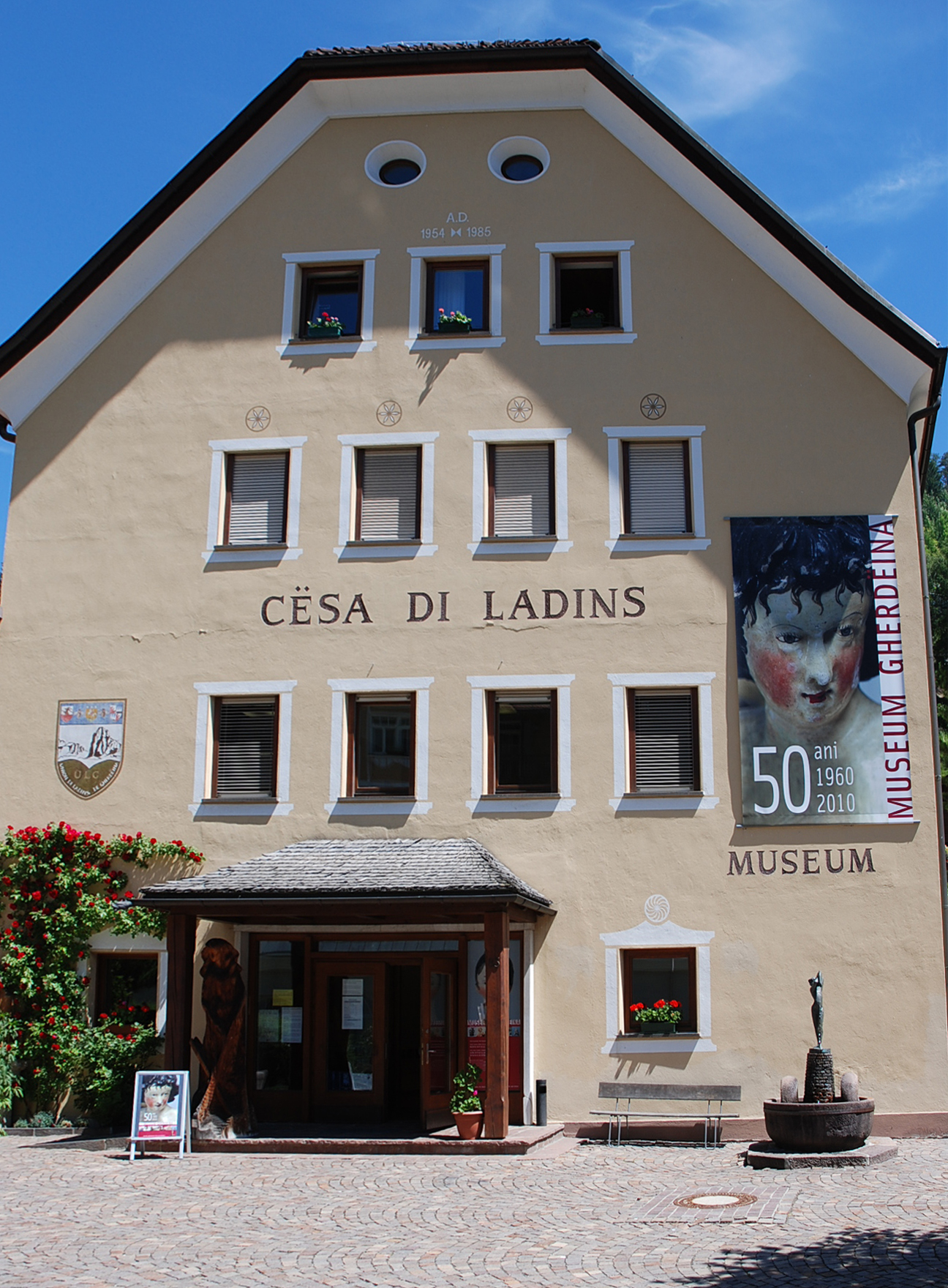

- Location within Italy
- Established: 1960
- Location: Urtijëi
- Coordinates: 46°34′26″N 11°40′28″E
- Type: Archeology, geology, history, toys
- Director: Dr. Paulina Moroder
- Website: Museum Gherdëina

The Gherdëina Local Heritage Museum was opened in the Cësa di Ladins in Urtijëi, in northernmost Italy, in 1960. The building is the seat of the Union di Ladins de Gherdëina a cultural organisation for the keeping of the Ladin language and heritage in Val Gherdëina. In addition to the museum, the building hosts a library specialized in Ladin language and culture.

The collections of the Gherdëina Museum enable the visitor to gain an informative insight into the cultural and natural world of Val Gherdëina. The collections are distributed over two floors and cover the following themes: wood carving art of the last three centuries, old locally produced wooden toys, a collection of paintings by local artists, the local archaeology, the region's fossils, minerals and the local flora and fauna.

== Sections ==
=== Entrance ===
At the entrance, the exhibition starts with several art objects like the Crucifix of Sëurasass (1932) by Baptist Walpoth and Vinzenz Peristi, as well as the oil painting by Josef Moroder-Lusenberg depicting Urtijëi in the year 1860 and three modern canvasses by Franz Noflaner.

=== Interiors from the St. Jacob church ===
The first exhibition room is dedicated to the original sculptures from St.James church in Urtijëi ascribed to Melchior (1622–1689) and Kassian (1710–1789) Vinazer. The local woodcarving Vinazer dynasty has had a lasting influence on the artistic production of Gherdëina. Also from St.James church is the original altarpiece (1751) by Franz Sebald Unterberger. The painting shows the Virgin Mary with child and the saints James and Henry.

=== Wooden sculptures from four centuries ===
The second exhibition room is dedicated to plastic art and offers a historical overview of the wood carving tradition of Gherdëina. To this collection belong works which range from those of the first famous woodcarving families Trebinger (1580–1689) and Vinazer (1622–1817) to a Saint Philomena of Rome by Dominik Mahlknecht (1796–1876), the sculptors of the 20th century Albin Pitscheider, Luis Insam-Tavella, Vinzenz Peristi and others. In addition, this room offers a wide variety of small sculptures ranging from the 18th to the mid-20th century, e.g. clock stands, caricatures, allegorical figures, cribs and crib figures and animal figurines. Of particular artistic interest as woodcarvings are the 120 figures by Albin Pitscheider (1877–1962), donated by his daughters. There is also a display of paintings by Josef Moroder-Lusenberg (1846–1939) and other local artists (e.g. Sontheimer, Demetz, Piazza).

=== Natural history of the Dolomites ===
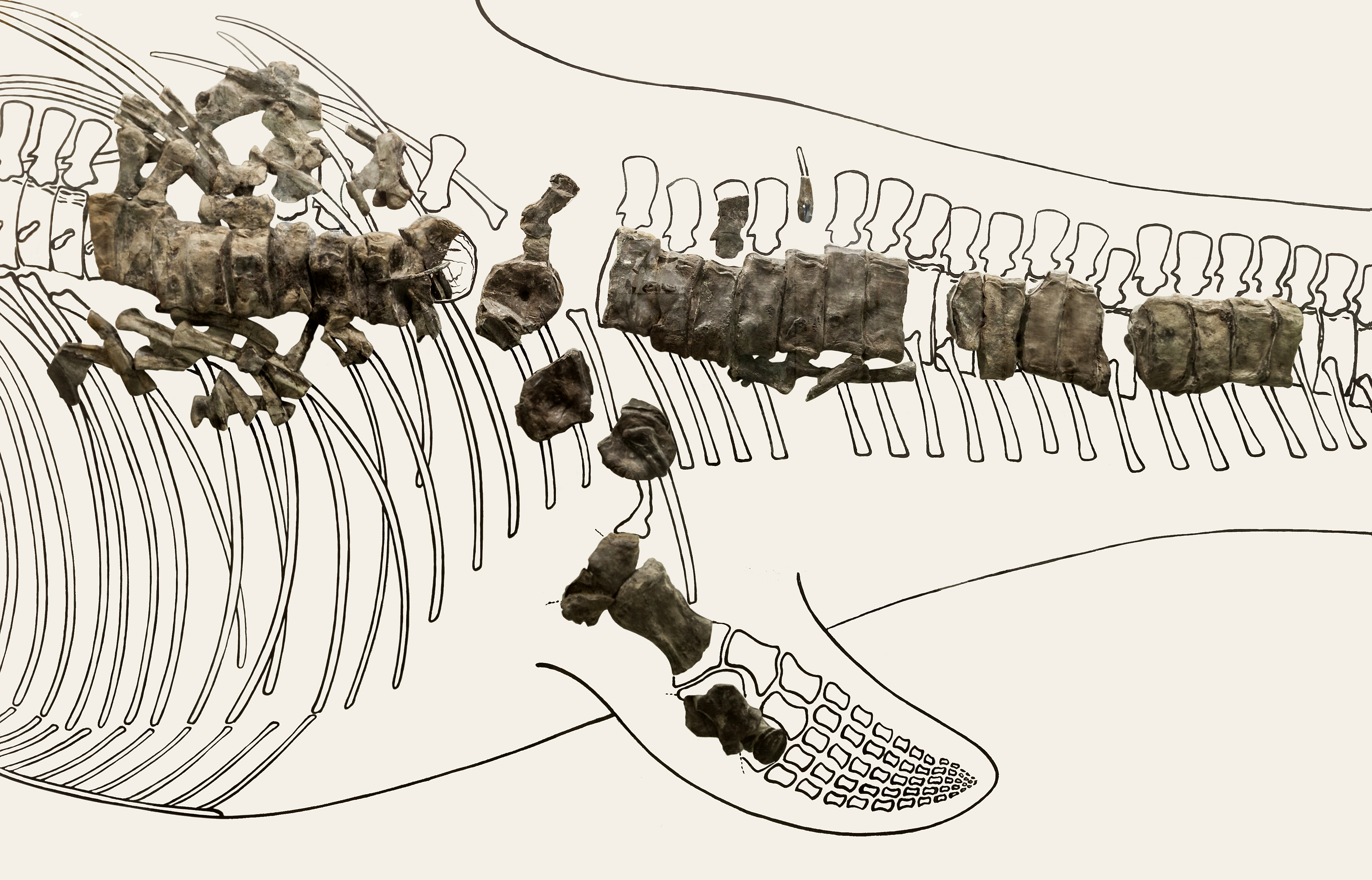
Cymbospondylus, Ichthyosaurus from Seceda

The third exhibition room is dedicated to natural history. The visitor is introduced to the evolution of the geological structure of the western Dolomites by way of didactic charts and illustrations arranged in cooperation with Prof. Broglio and Prof. Posenato of the University of Ferrara with a collection of local fossils, rocks and minerals. Among the fossils on show, special mention should be made of carbonized remainders of plants (Ortiseia), various gastropod imprints, a fossilized fish (Archaeolepidotus leonardii Accordi) and the reconstructed skeleton of an Ichthyosaurus, as well as coral colonies and ammonites. In addition to a cross-section of local minerals, including those typical of Mont Sëuc, this room also contains a collection of minerals from other alpine deposits (e.g. Teis, Ahrntal, Pfitsch) and from abroad, such as rock crystal, garnet, beryl, apophyllite, aragonite, sulphur, Celestine and amethyst. In the same room, another section offers an insight into the many-sided alpine flora and fauna by way of a herbarium and a collection of stuffed animals, e.g. an albino roe deer and local birds, and a butterfly collection.

In the staircase to the second floor, the museum displays the Fastentuch (Lenten cloth) from the St.James's church in Urtijëi (1620–30).

=== Wooden toys ===
In this room, you can find the old wooden toys from Gherdëina, one of the thematic highlights of the museum. This collection was, for the most part, brought together by Johann Senoner-Vastlé before the Second World War. It consists of a most representative selection of toys, offering an overview of the diversity of articles produced in Gherdëina between 1750 and 1940. The typical Gherdëina jointed doll, called as well dutch doll, peg doll or stick doll, can be seen in many different sizes.

=== Prehistory of Gherdëina ===
A separate section on the second floor is dedicated to the prehistory of the valley. On show are the remarkable Stone Age finds from Plan de Frea under the Gardena Pass consisting of flint tools among the most ancient traces found in the Gherdëina region (ca. 7000-5000 B.C.) as well as the evidence from the Bronze Age (ca. 1700-750 B.C.), such as the bronze dagger from the Balest mountain or the bronze needles from Resciesa and Mastlé in the Gherdëina Valley. The Iron Age finds from the large complex of Col de Flam a hill near Urtijëi, e.g. burial offerings from cremation graves, in particular fibulae, rings and iron lance heads, single glass beads and bronze pendants as well as various tools (400-15 B.C. Latène period).

=== Luis Trenker ===
On the second floor the other section is dedicated to the writer, actor, film director and rock climber Luis Trenker (Urtijëi 1894 – Bolzano 1990), that presents objects of personal possessions, honorary deeds, medals for bravery, film prizes (e.g. Golden Globus, Filmband in Gold) publications and other material of the Luis Trenker central archive donated by the Trenker family to the museum in March 2004.

== Publications by the museum ==
- Matthias Frei, Georg Innerebner, Rudolf Moroder-Rudolfine, Christian Moroder, Edgar Moroder, Viktor Welponer: Gröden und sein Heimatmuseum. Ein talkundlicher Führer. St. Ulrich 1966. (German).
- Viktor Welponer, Edgar Moroder, Reimo Lunz, Adolf Kostner, Johann Moroder, Rudolf Moroder-Rudolfine, Rita Stäblein. Foto: Robert Moroder und Luis Piazza: L Museum de Gherdëina – Das Grödner Heimatmuseum. Überblick über Grödens Kunst-, Natur- und Vorgeschichte. 1985. (Ladin and German).
- Rudolf Moroder-Rudolfine: Albino Pitscheider: Scultëur y Maester – Bildhauer und Fachlehrer – Scultore e insegnante d'arte. 1987.(Ladin, German, Italian).
- Nicolò Rasmo: Gli scultori Vinazer. Origini dell'attività scultorea in Val Gardena. Mit einem Beitrag über Giuseppe Antonio Vinazer von Juan Nicolau Castro, Toledo. Abbildungen und Werkverzeichnis. 1989. (Italian)
- Rita Stäblein, Robert Moroder: La vedla chiena de Gherdëina – Altes Grödner Holzspielzeug – Il Giocattolo in legno della Val Gardena. 1994. (Ladin, German, Italian). English translation 1995.
- Peter Neuendorff (translation from old German): Kochbuch der Anna Maria Sanoner und der Felicita Unterplatzer. (German).
- Gert Ammann, Edgar Moroder, Ingrid Moroder-Runggaldier und Robert Moroder: Josef Moroder Lusenberg. 1846–1939. Catalog, 1994.(Ladin, German, Italian).
- Ingrid Runggaldier-Moroder, Barbara Tomelleri und Robert Moroder: Leo Crepaz da Maidl. Catalog. 1998. (Ladin, German, Italian).
- Paulina Moroder und Rudolf Moroder-Rudolfine: Hans Sontheimer 1906–1981. Catalog 1999. (Ladin, German, Italian).
- Cristl Moroder, Rudolf Moroder-Rudolfine und Danila Serafini: Ludwig Moroder 1879–1953. Scultëur y maester. Bildhauer und Fachlehrer. Scultore e insegnante d’arte. N lecort di 50 ania dala mort. Gedächtnisschrift zum 50. Todestag. Edizione commemorativa nel 50.mo anniversario della morte. 2003. (Ladin, German, Italian).
- Eva Gadner, Gert Amman, Peter Weiermair: Josef Moroder Lusenberg, Bera Sepl da Jumbierch, Herausgeber Istitut Ladin Micura da Ru, Museum Gherdeina, Südtiroler Kulturinstitut 2009. ISBN 978-88-8171-085-0. (Ladin, German, Italian).
- In Preparation: Die Grödner Altarbaukunst von 1700 bis 1940. 450 S. (2010).
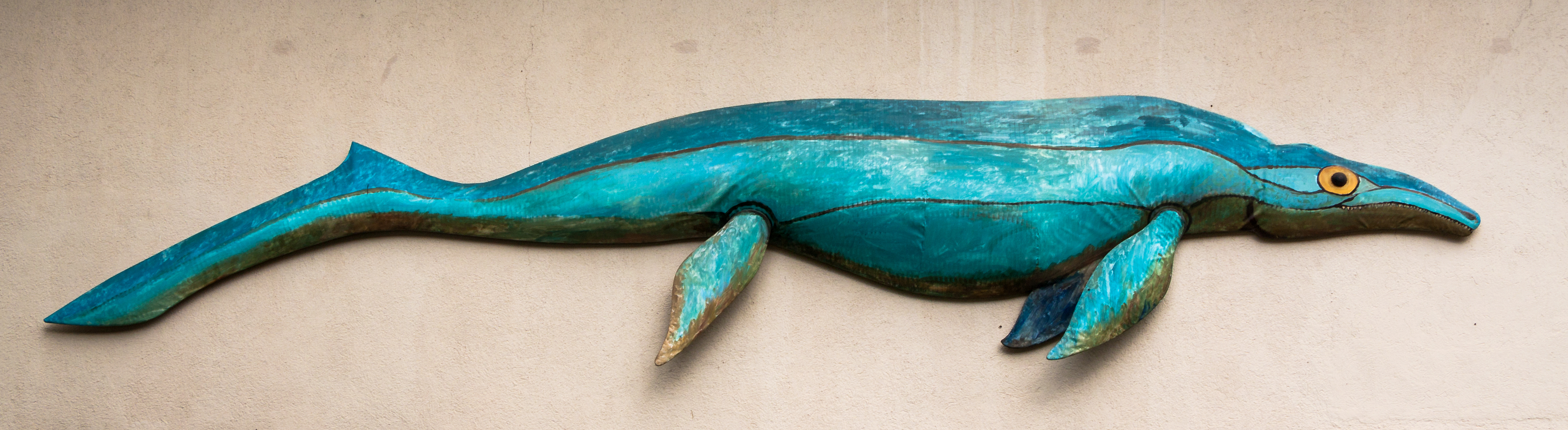
Life size model of Cymbospondylus spec.

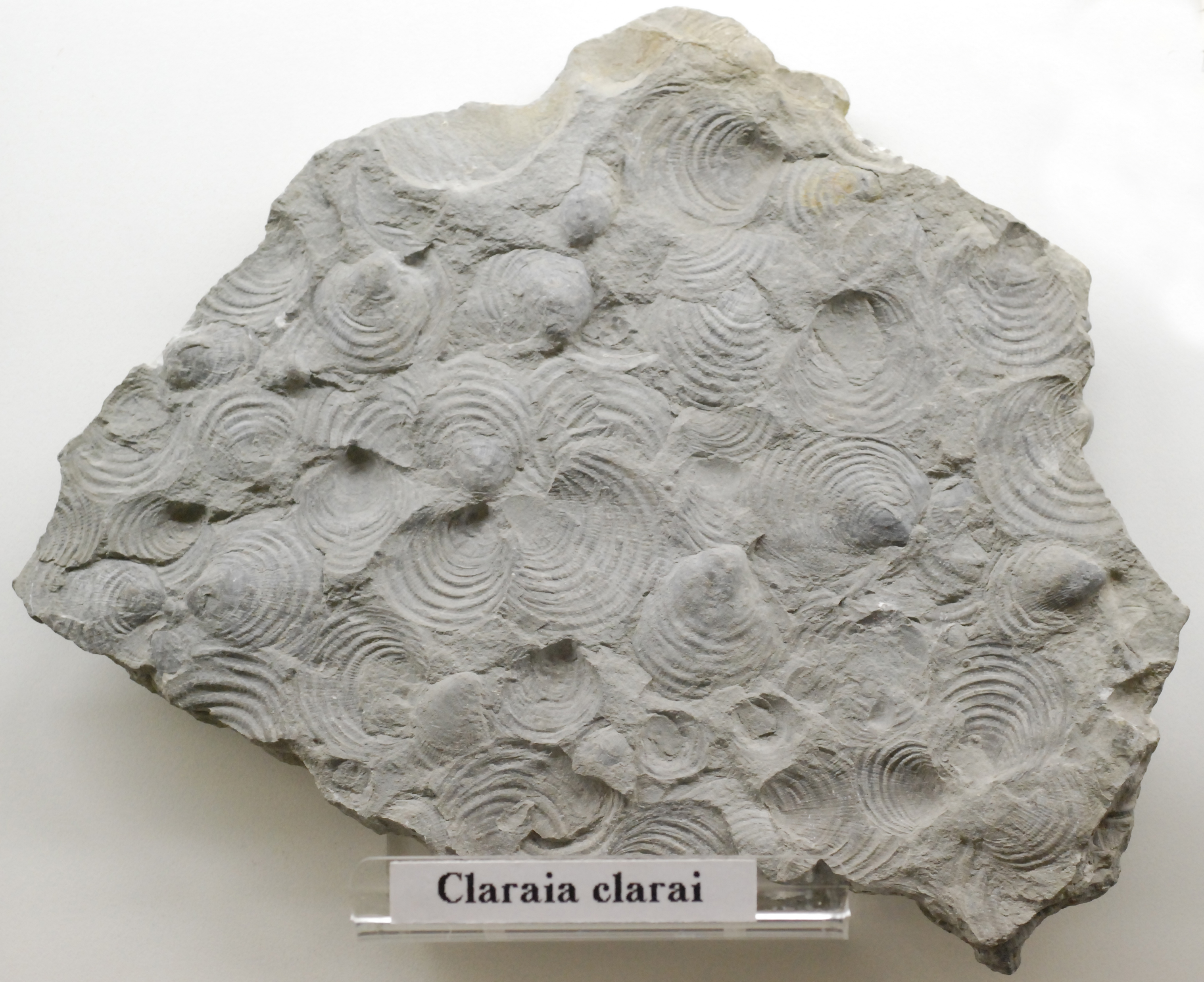
fossil

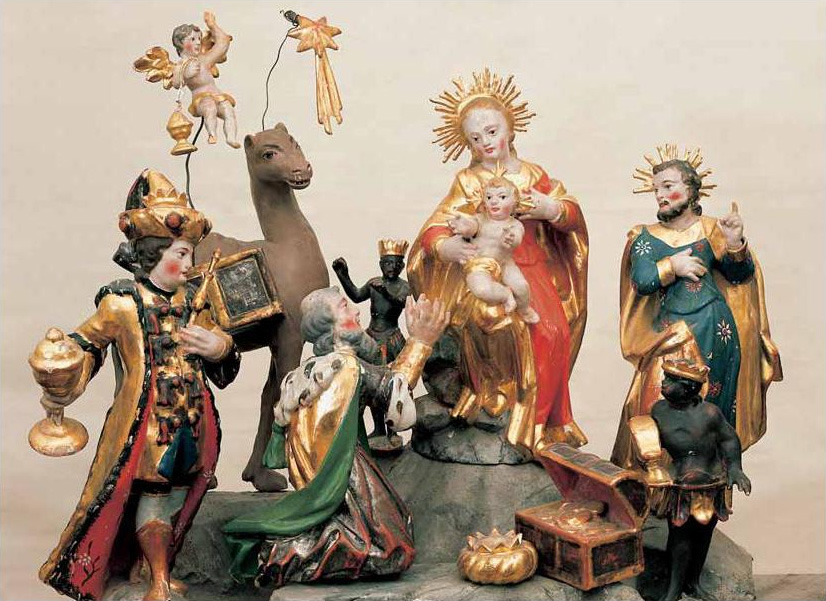
baroque crest

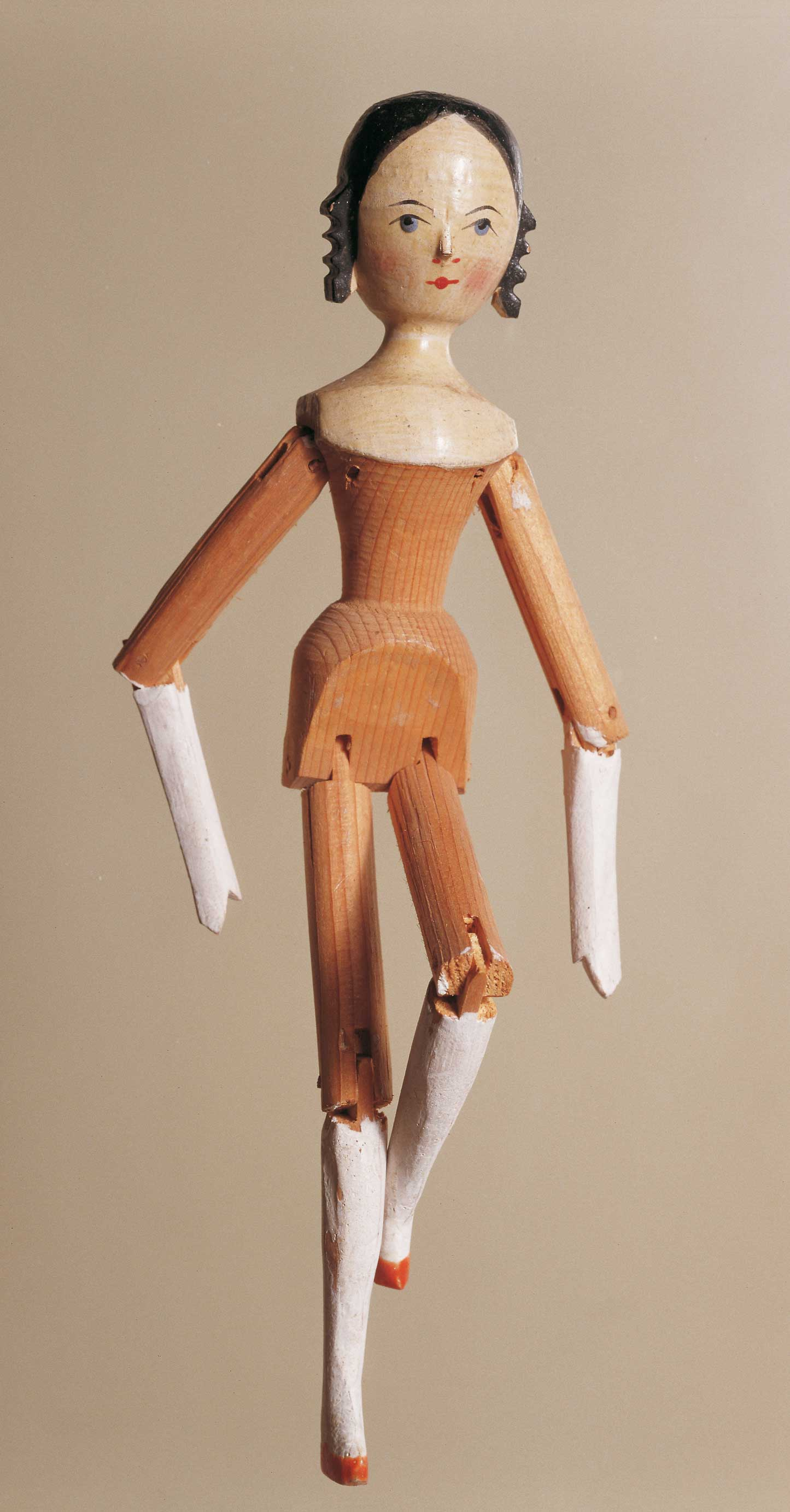
dutch doll

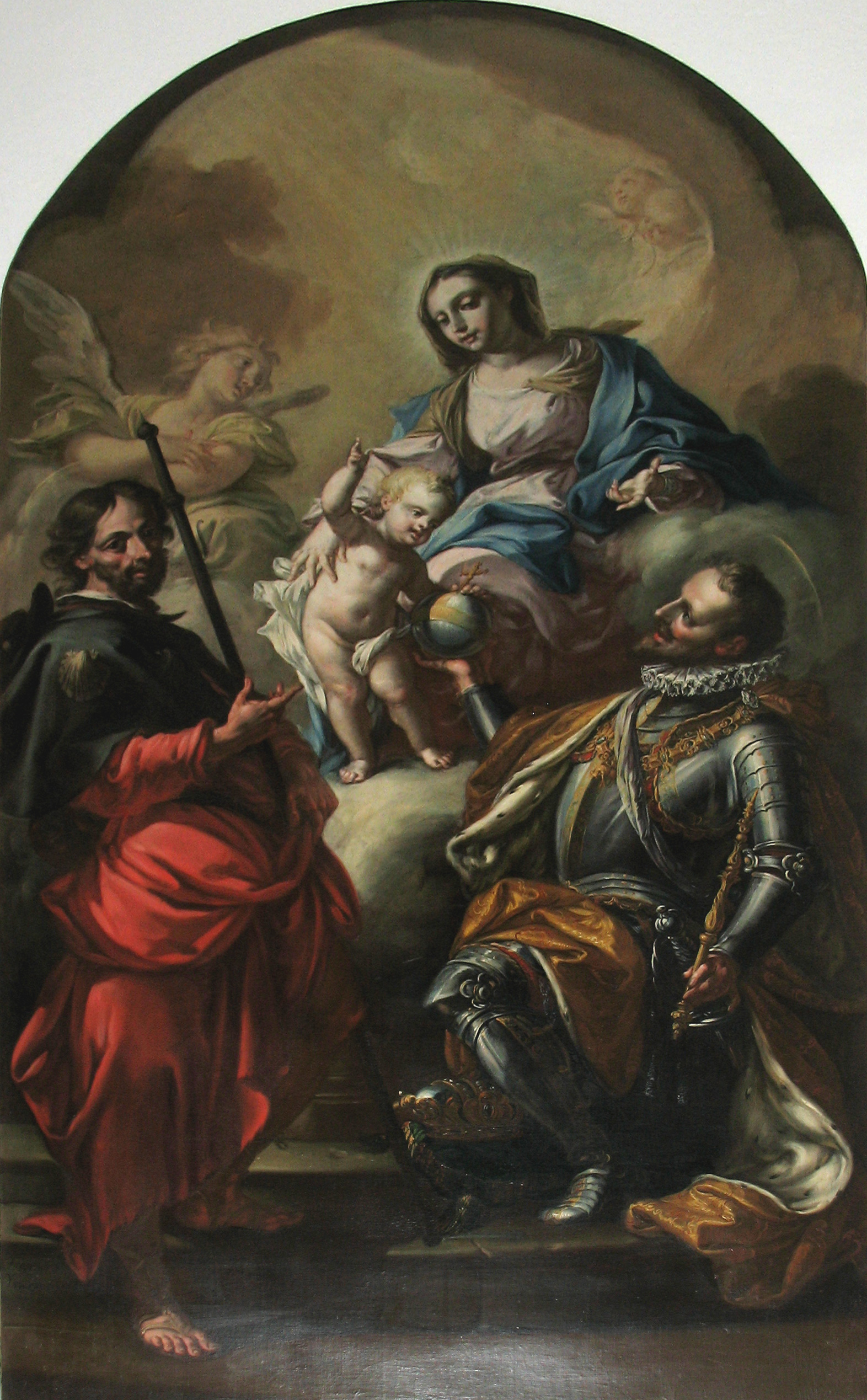
altarpiece from the Saint Jacob church
