= Ludwig Moroder =

Italian sculptor

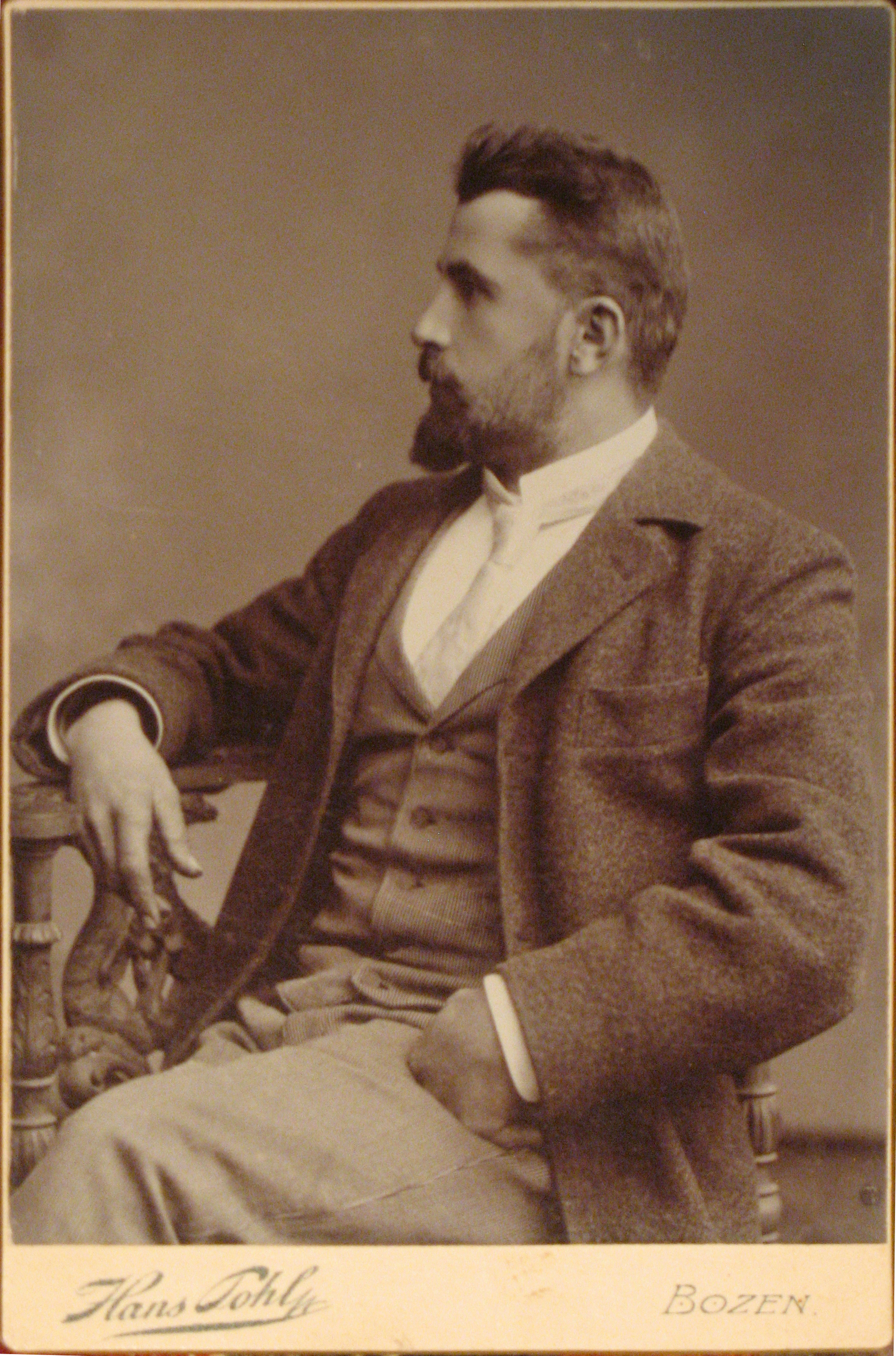
Ludwig Moroder in his 20s

Ludwig Moroder "Lenert" (Ortisei, 7 November 1879 – Ortisei, 10 August 1953) was an Italian sculptor and art teacher. He was also known as:Ludwig Moroder dl Meune or Lodovico Moroder.

== Biography ==
He was born in Urtijëi, which at the time was a famous tourist destination in Val Gardena, his family was renowned in the small town as its members were appointed to be lifelong sacristans in the local church. His father used to carve wooden Crosses but he passed before he could pass the skill onto his son. Ludwig learnt to carve wood from Professor Franz Haider, Josef Moroder-Lusenberg and Franz Tavella. He worked in the Moroder family workshop as well in Lenert's house in Ortisei, he was also promoted to the role of technical director in the atelier of the Moroder brothers in Offenburg in Baden-Württemberg Germany. Between 1900 and 1914 he sculpted several altars requested by churches for the Moroder Brothers workshop, these altars were characterised by Neo-Gothic styled statues.

According to his daughter, he took part in the production of the sculpture of Elizabeth of Hungary attributed to Rudolf Moroder, which is now exposed in the parochial church of Ortisei. this particular sculpture was awarded a gold medal at the world exposition in Paris in 1900. In 1911 he married Adele Moroder which had blood ties with Franz Moroder the owner of the Moroder Brothers workshop, because of his family ties he was employed in the workshop of Lenert's house, at a later time four of his wife's brothers died in WWI, leaving his wife as the sole heir. Adele bore five children: Alessandro in 1913, Maria in 1914, Carlo in 1917, Pauli in 1919 and Alex in 1923. Two of his children, Carlo and Pauli, became wood carvers.

Ludwig Moroder in 1918 was charged by the Vienna government to dedicate his life to the teaching of drawing, sculpting and modelling in the school of art of Ortisei where he taught for 27 years. Under the influence of the director of the school, Guido Balsamo Stella, between 1924 and 1927 Ludwig Moroder underwent a significant evolution of his sculpting style, which became more refined and contemporary. His numerous travels in the Italian art cities also contributed to the evolution of his style. In 1920 Ludwig Moroder founded the artistic circle of the artisans of Ortisei.

On 24 April 1935 he was awarded the title of "Cavaliere dell'Ordine della Corona d'Italia" (knight of the Italian order of the crown) by the king Victor Emmanuel III of Italy. In 1940 he exposed at the "VII Triennale di Milano" (an art convention in Milan) a colossal statue of the holy Virgin Mary he sculpted with Rudolf Vallazza. In 1943 a statue representing Saint Francis of Sales was donated by the journalists of the Italian newspaper "L'Avvenire d'Italia" to Pope Pius XII.

After the Nazi occupation of Alto Adige in 1943 his right to teach art was revoked, he chose to remain in Italy despite the danger. He began teaching again in 1945 but decided to retire in 1949.

== Main works ==
Some of his most famous works are kept in the parochial church of Ortisei: Saint Ulrico, the statue of the sacred heart of Jesus, Saint Paul, the crucifixion of the Christ as well as Saint Anthony of Padova are some of the most renowned. In the chapel of the Fallen in Ortisei, designed by Professor Adolf Keim is kept the Pietà. In Ortisei, there is also a statue dedicated to J.B Purger, the constructor of the road of Val Gardena.

== Images ==
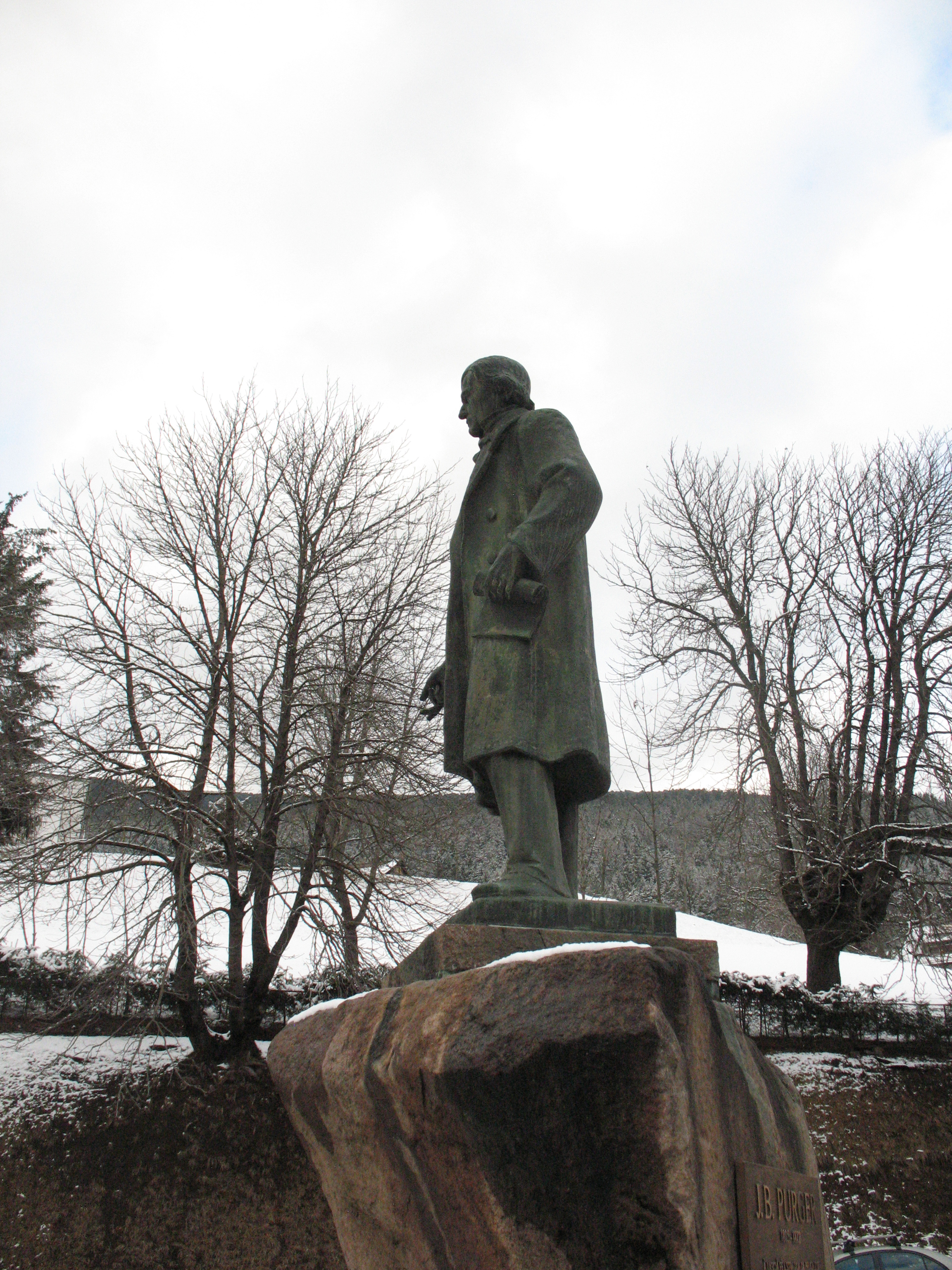
statue dedicated to J.B Purger

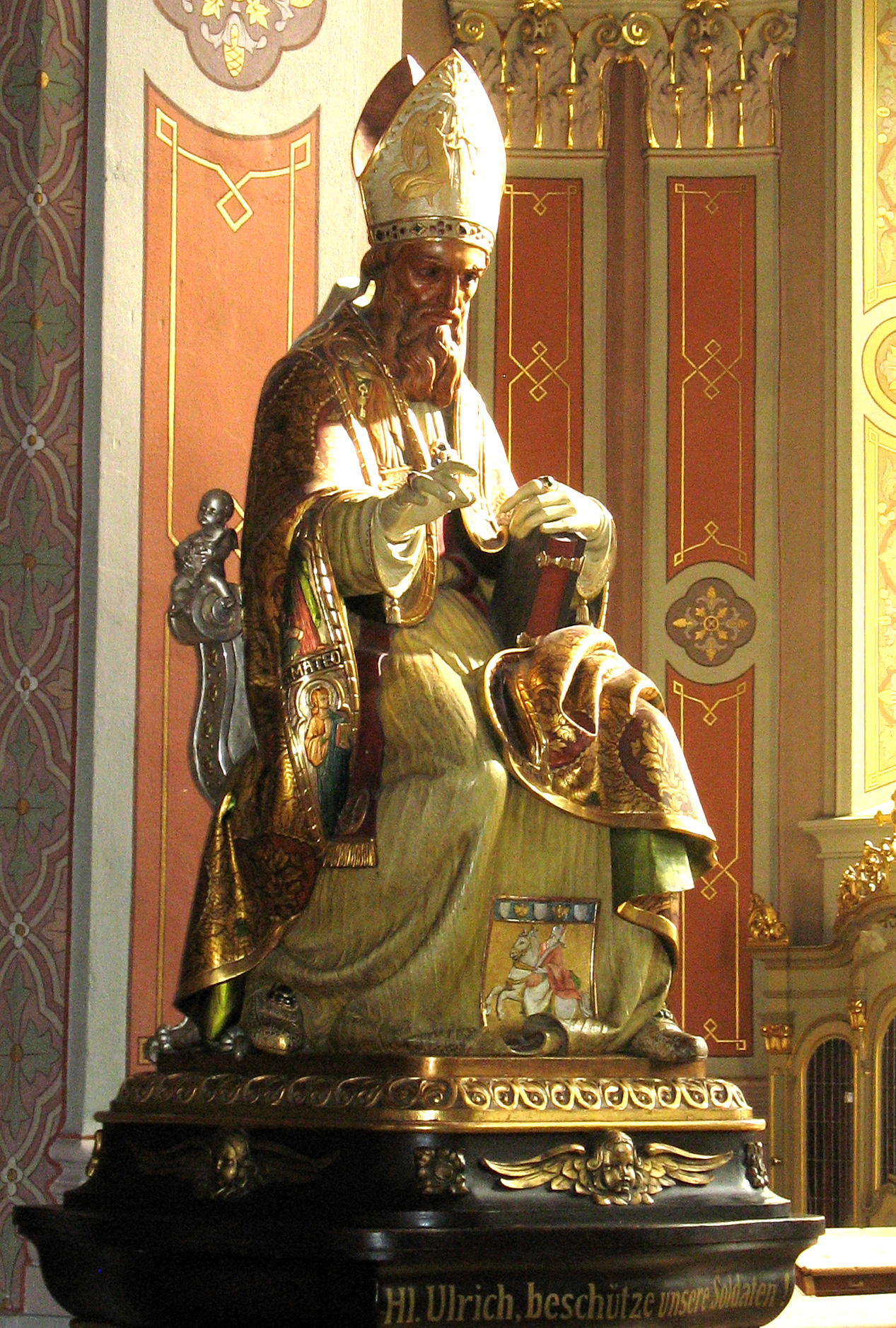
Wooden statue of Saint Ulric 1932

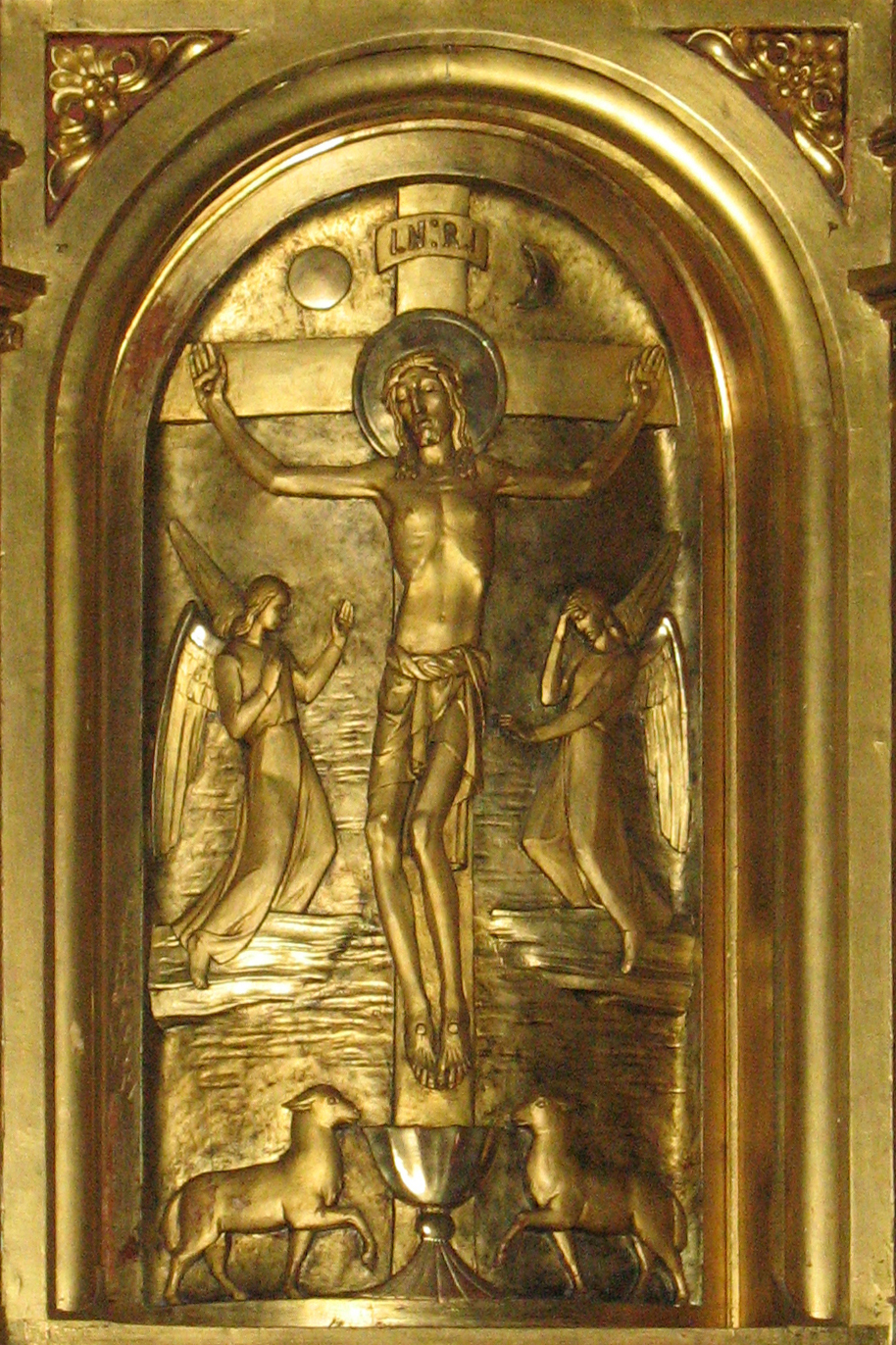
Main altar of the parochial church of Ortisei, 1943

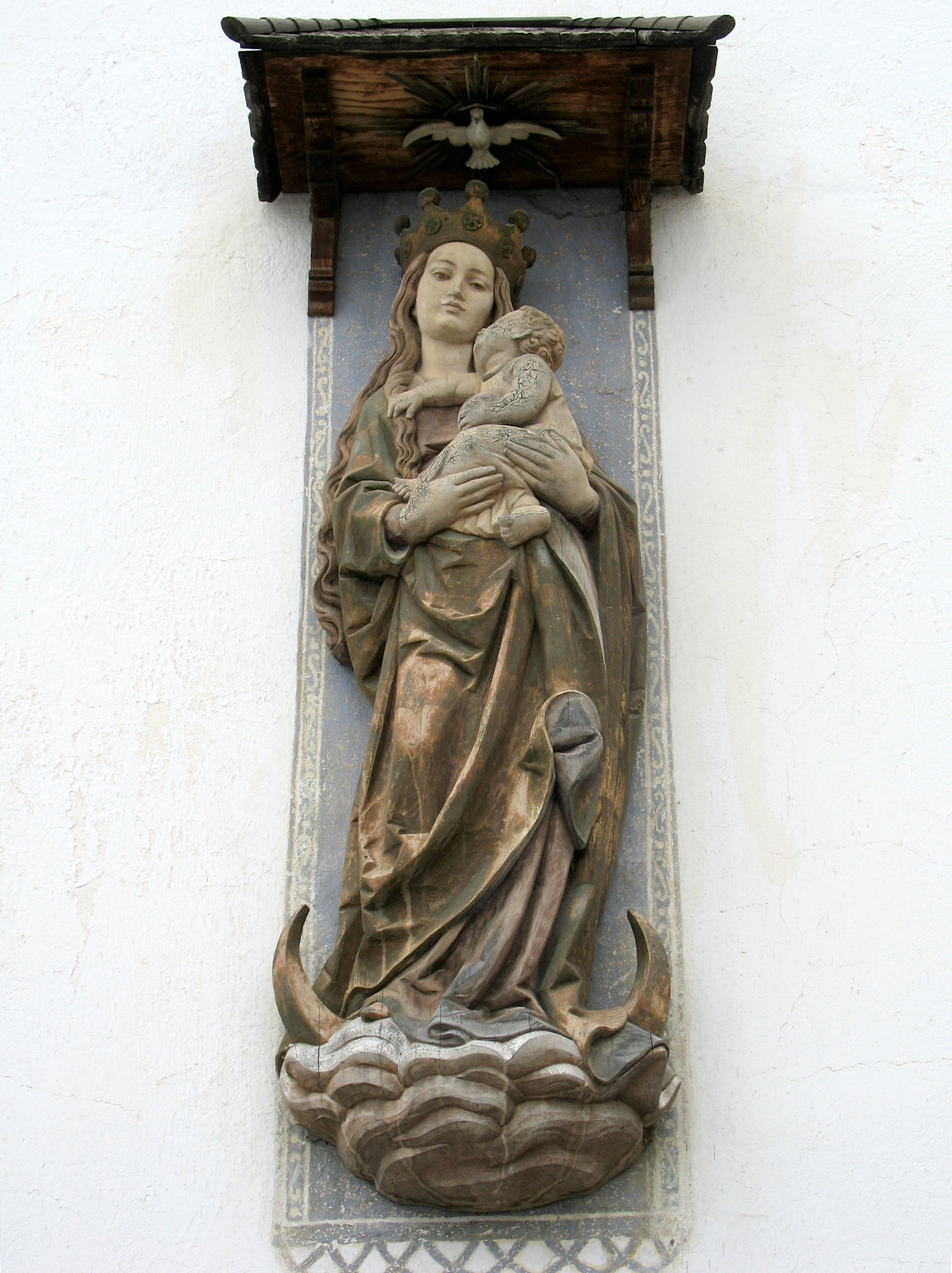
Virgin Mary outside the Lenert residence, Ortisei

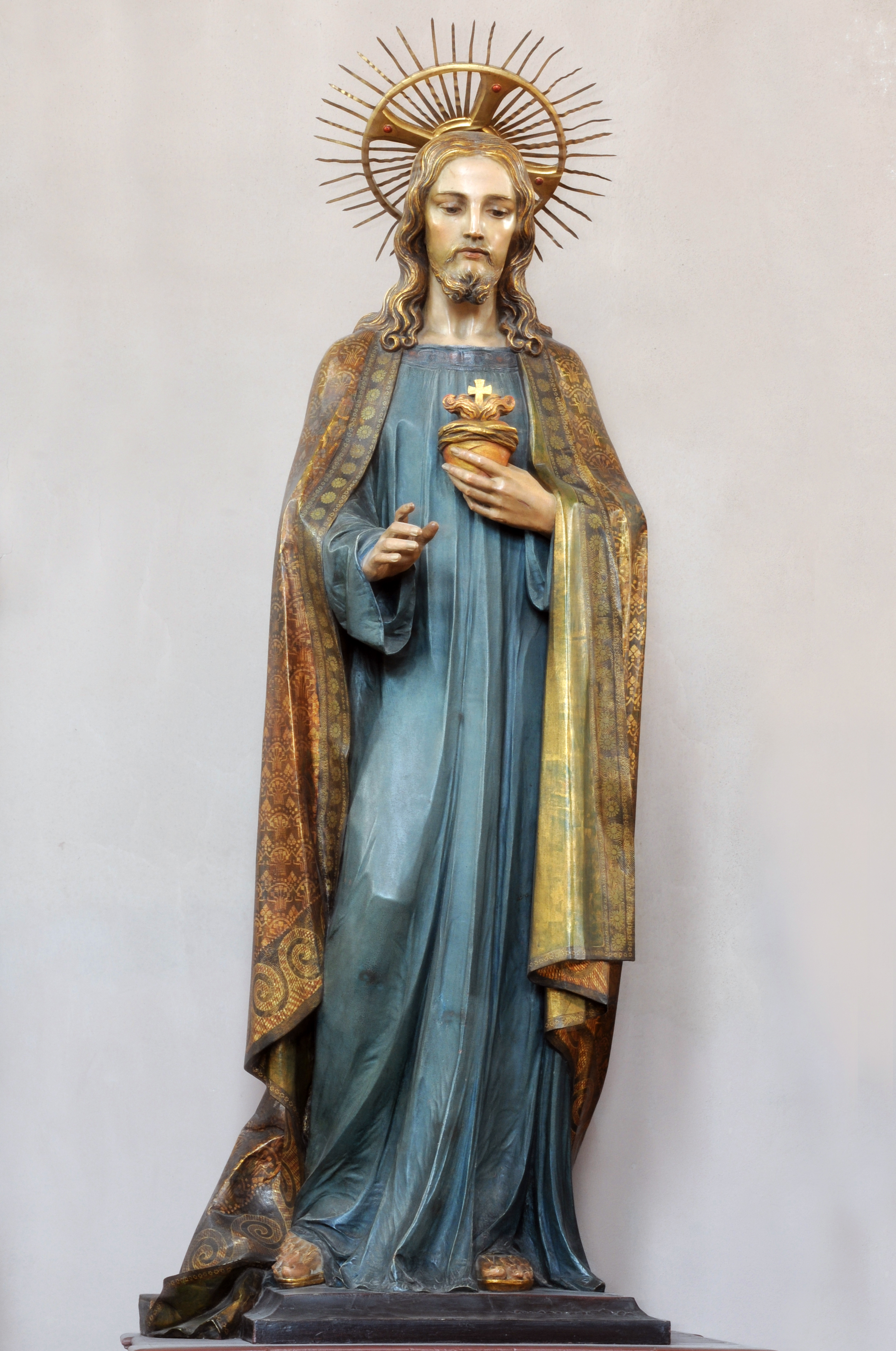
Sacred heart of Jesus in the parochial church of Ortisei, 1914

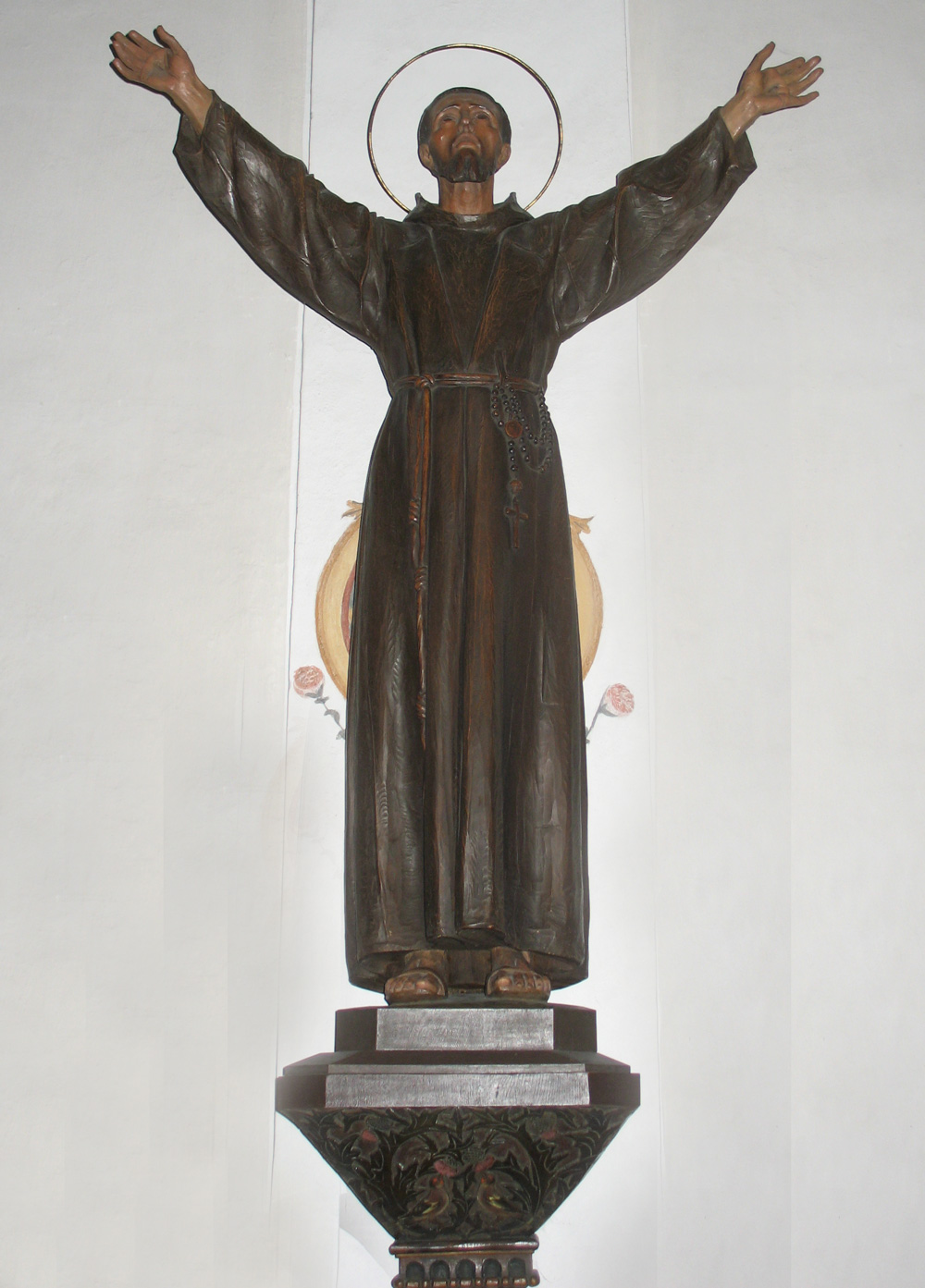
Saint Francis in the church of Saint Antony in Ortisei, 1914

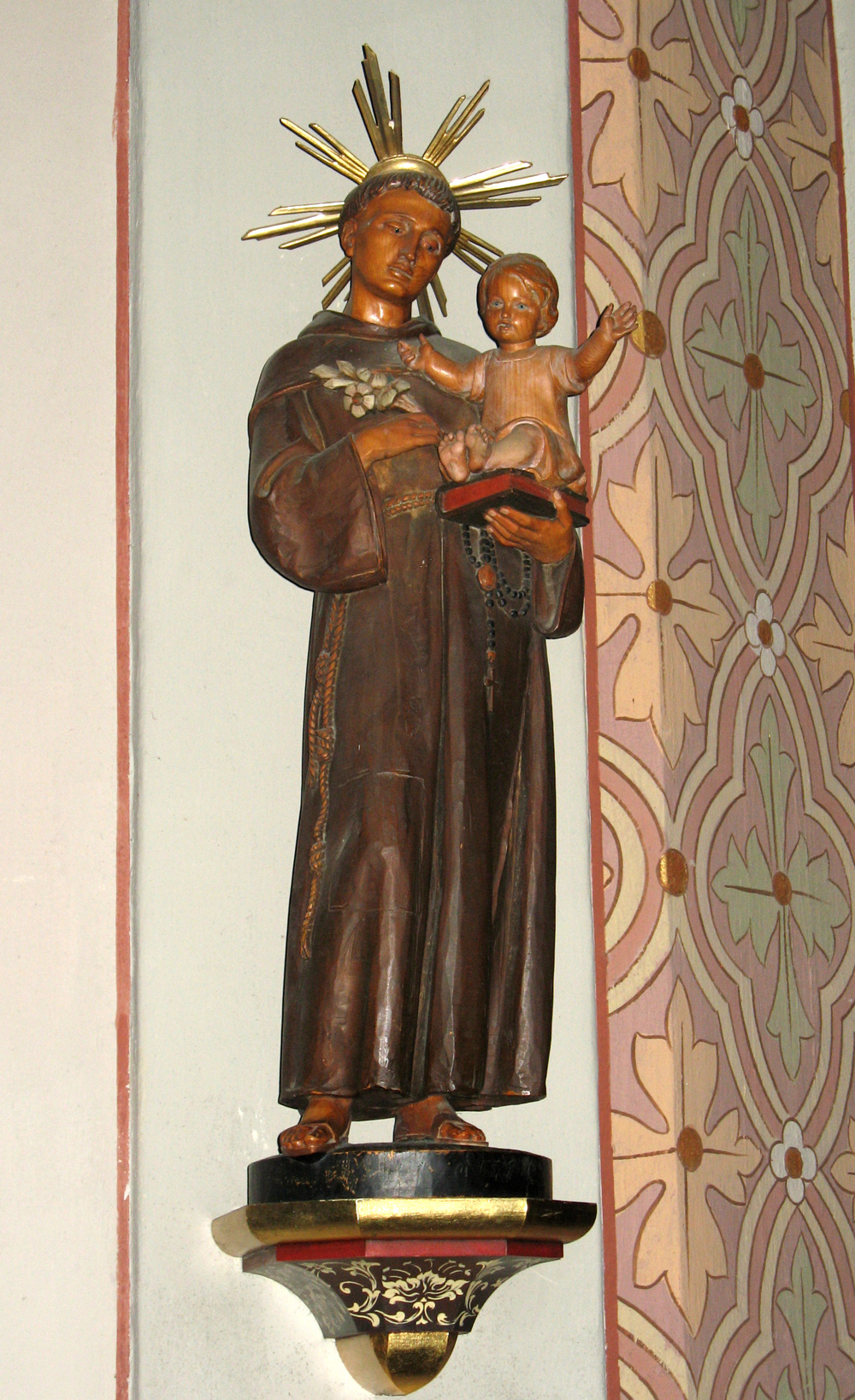
Saint Antony of Padova in the parochial church of Ortisei, 1935

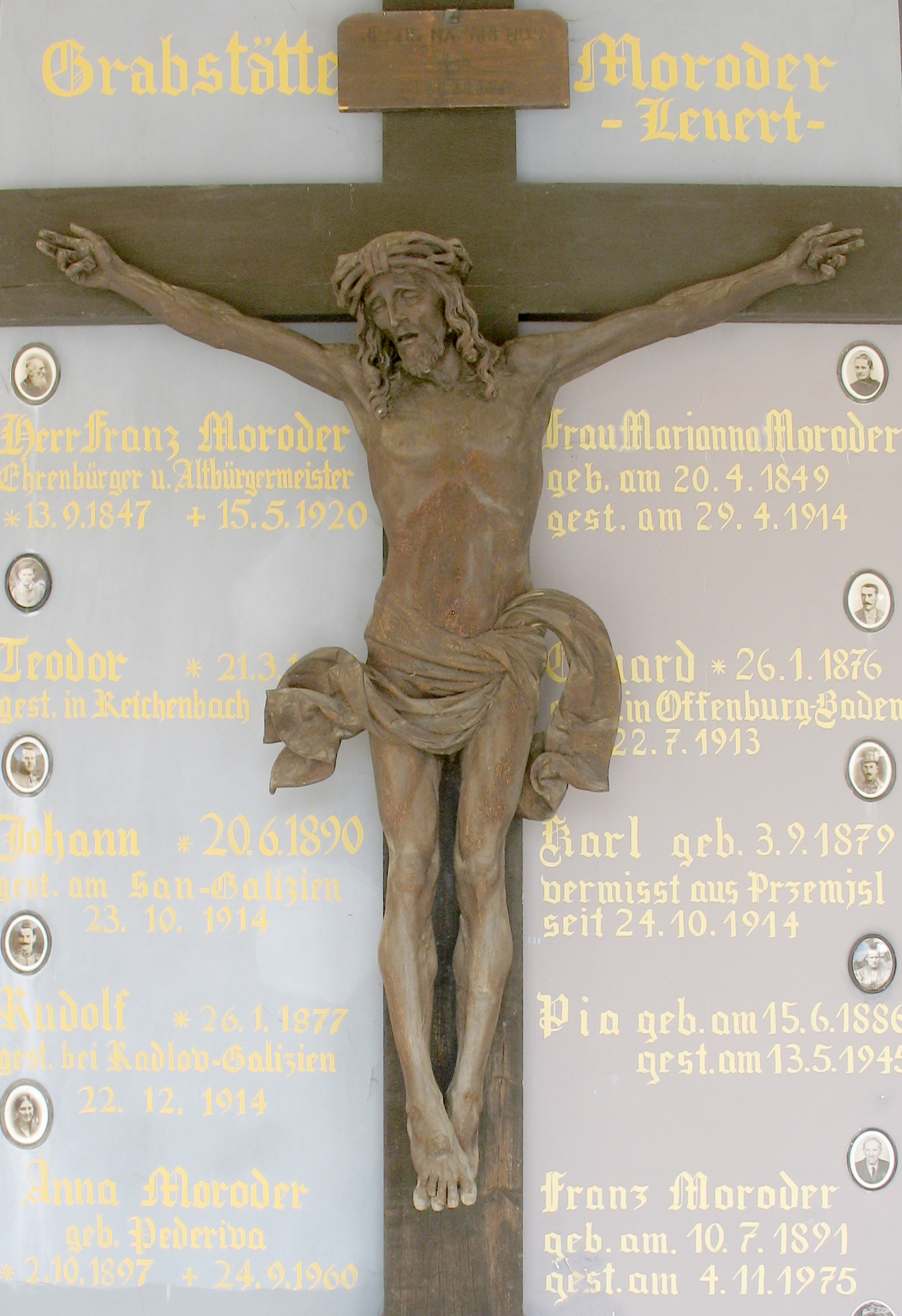
Cross on the Moroder-Lenert family tomb in Ortisei, 1920

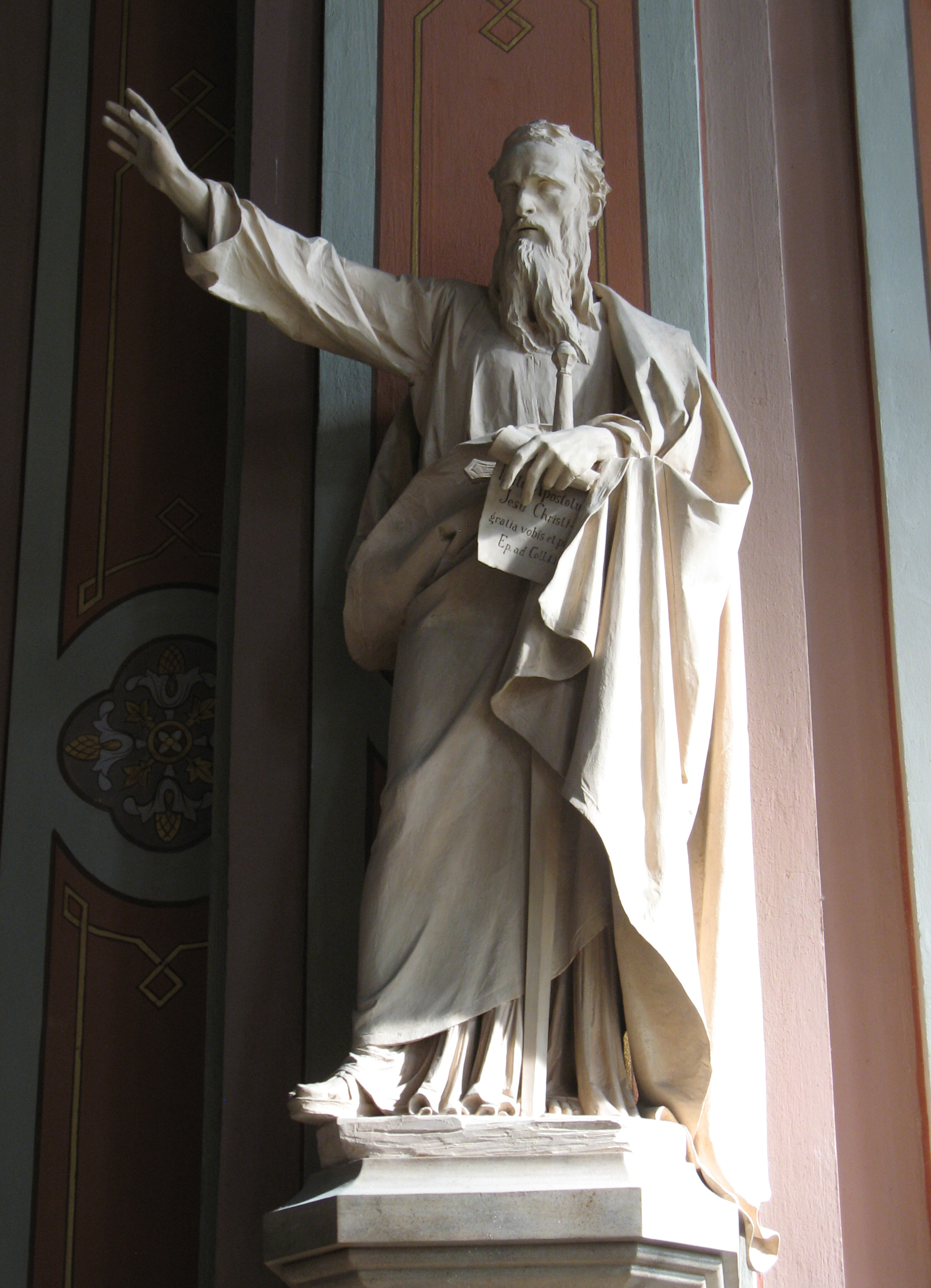
Statue of Saint Paul of Tarso in the parochial church of Ortisei, 1907
