= Kollwitz =

Kollwitz may refer to:

- Käthe Kollwitz (1867–1945), German artist
  - Käthe Kollwitz House (Moritzburg), a museum
  - Käthe Kollwitz Museum (Berlin)
  - Käthe Kollwitz Museum (Cologne)
  - Käthe Kollwitz Prize

Others

- 8827 Kollwitz, main-belt asteroid
