= Käthe Kollwitz Museum =

Käthe Kollwitz Museum may refer to:

- Käthe Kollwitz Museum (Berlin)
- Käthe Kollwitz Museum (Cologne)
- Käthe Kollwitz House (Moritzburg)
