= Mother with her Dead Son =

Sculpture by Käthe Kollwitz

Mother with Dead Son
- Mutter mit totem Sohn (German)
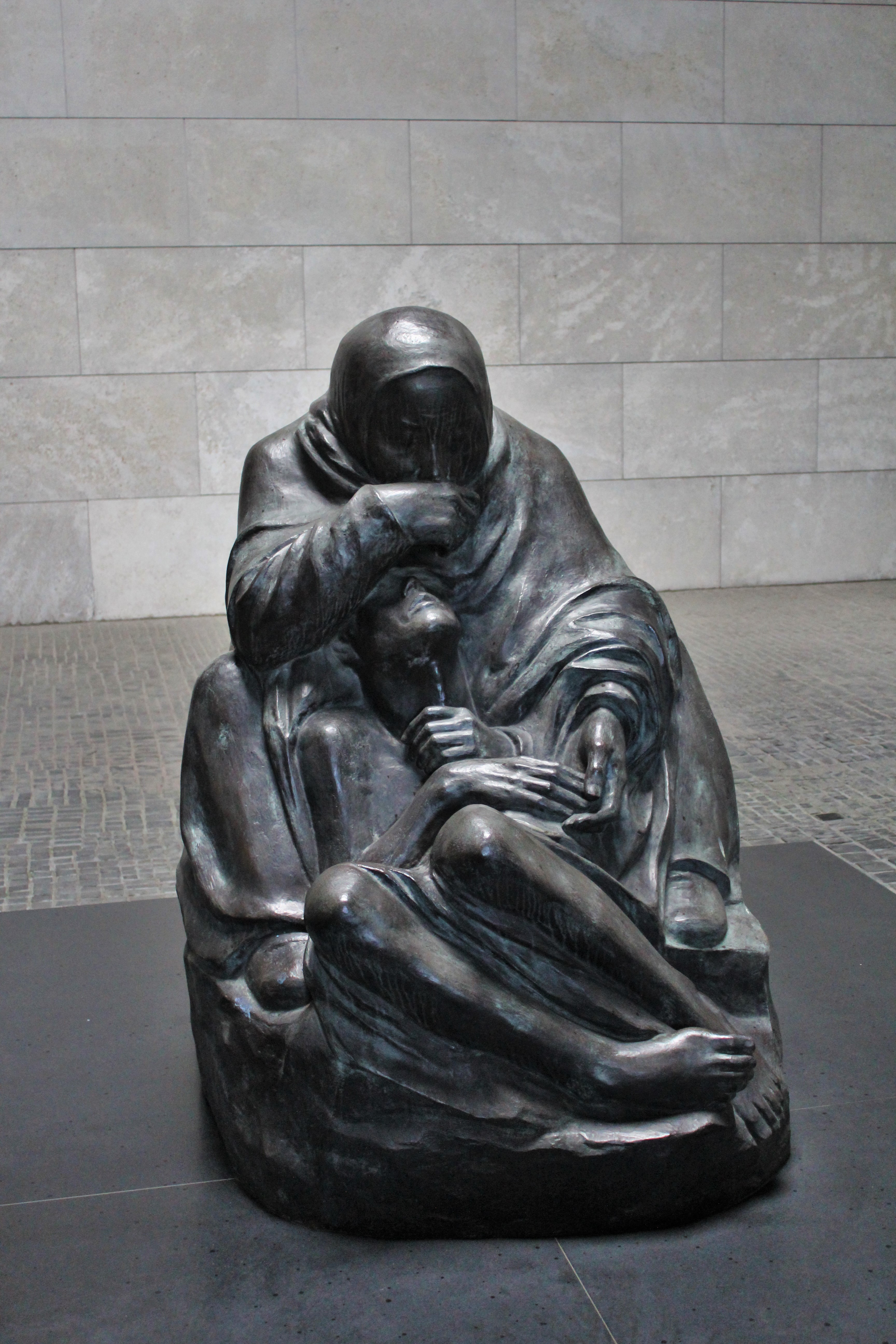
- Enlarged version of Käthe Kollwitz's sculpture Mother with her Dead Son (Pietà) in the Neue Wache on the Unter Den Linden in Berlin.
- Artist: Harald Haacke, after original statue by Käthe Kollwitz
- Medium: Bronze
- Location: Berlin

Mother with her Dead Son (German: Mutter mit totem Sohn) is a Pietà bronze sculpture by the artist Käthe Kollwitz, from 1937-1938.

== History ==
The sculpture was made in 1937 or 1938 and is dedicated to Kollwitz's son Peter, who was killed in action in World War I. It follows from her work, Mourning Parents, which she completed between 1914 and 1932. A sculpture of Kollwitz's Pietà, enlarged four times by Harald Haacke, has been in the "Central Memorial of the Federal Republic of Germany to the Victims of War and Tyranny" in Karl Friedrich Schinkel's Neue Wache since it was established in 1993. The original is hosted at the Käthe Kollwitz Museum in Cologne.

Kollwitz's Pietà differs from classic Pietà representations in that the dead son does not rest on his mother's knees, but rather lies crouching on the ground between her legs. He is embraced by the figure of the mother and looks more like a child seeking protection in his mother's lap.

On the anniversary of the death of her son Peter, who died in 1914, Kollwitz wrote in her diary in 1937, "I am working on the small sculpture that arose from the plastic attempt to make the elderly. It has now become something of a pietà. The mother is sitting with the dead son on her lap between her knees. It is no longer pain, but reflection.".

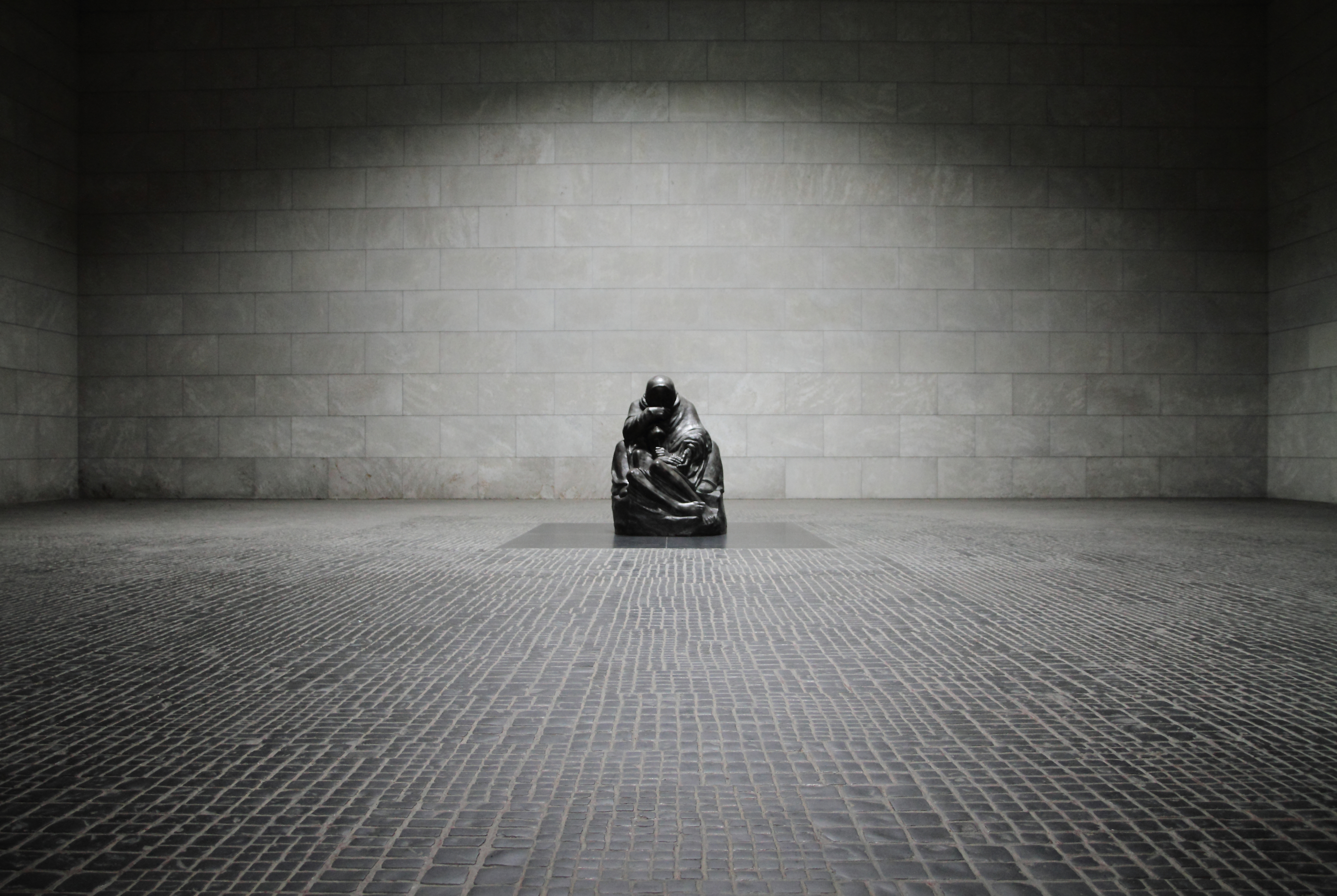

The announcement by the then Federal Chancellor Helmut Kohl that the Pietà of Kollwitz should be chosen for the memorial sparked a heated debate. Kohl was accused from various quarters that a mother grieving for her son did not do justice to the victims of the Holocaust, since it only related to the World War I.
