= Walter Moroder =

Italian sculptor

Walter Moroder (born 10 May 1963 in Ortisei in Val Gardena, Italy ) is a contemporary South Tyrolean sculptor and draftsman.

== Biography ==
Walter Moroder is the son of the Val Gardena sculptor David Moroder. From 1977 to 1980 he attained a diploma at the State-run Art School in Ortisei in Val Gardena. After apprenticeship training in the father's studio, from 1983 to 1988 he studied sculpture at the Academy of Fine Arts in Munich, in 1987 he studied as a master's degree student under Hans Ladner.

Moroder's interest in non-European cultures led him on to study trips to Mexico and Guatemala in 1987, as well as to Egypt in 1994, and to Sulawesi and Java in 1996. In 2001 Moroder resigned from his job and decided to live drawing and modelling at the State Vocational School for Sculpture in Ortisei. He lives as a freelance artist in Ortisei in Val Gardena.

== Style and pieces ==
Walter Moroder is well versed in drawing and large-format woodcuts, his artistic motive is sculptural and sculptural and results from experiences of inadequacy with the south tyrolenian sculptural tradition. The artist mainly uses wood, plaster and also casts in bronze.

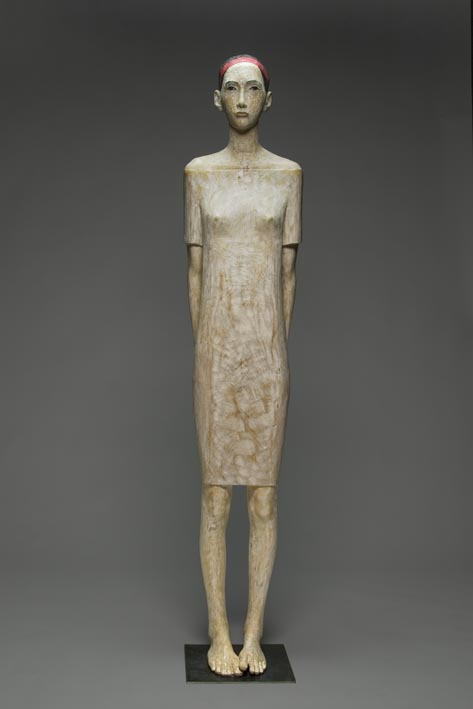
Sogni Lontani, 2003, Swiss stone pine, acrylic, glass eyes, 176 cm

One of Moroder's core subjects is the human figure; predominantly female figures and female bodies. Moroder represents his subjects standing in a waiting posture with slim proportions without any recognizable relationship to the real space - except for the floor - and mostly without a pedestal or elevation.

In the design of the details such as clothing, hands, feet, mouth or throat encrypted gestures and archaic images similar to the Greek, Egyptian and Asian influences in conjunction with elements of a non-everyday life-world can be observed. Moroder represents well known opposites between visible and invisible, male and female, concealment and nudity, body and mind, feeling and psyche.

The main theme in these works often revolves around experiences of ambivalence such as grace and grace, around androgynous identities, around the aura and presence of the absent, around the experience of death and fascination.

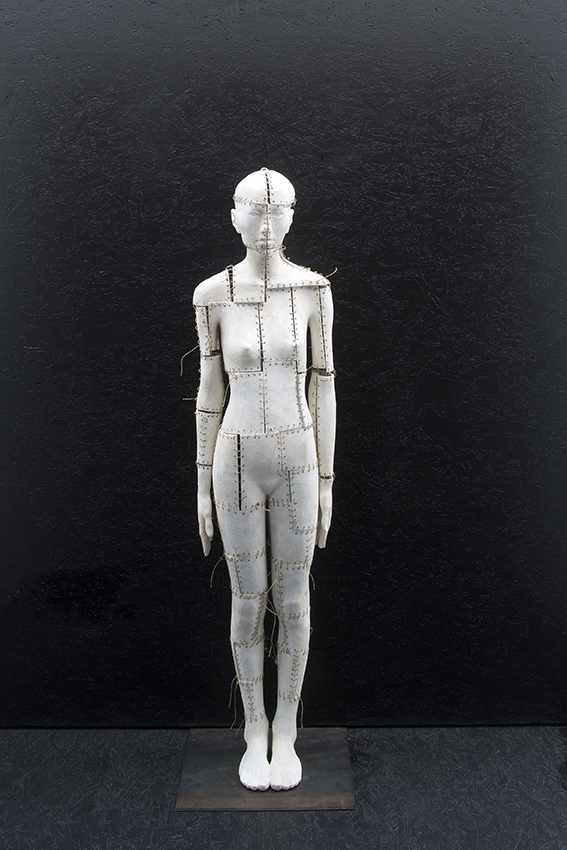
Cujida, 2015, Swiss stone pine, acrylic, cord, bells, 164 cm

When working in the studio, Moroder generally avoids a living model when looking for forms and avoids any realism and narrative content. A number of individual works illustrate the disappearance of the human figure or they turn out to be precarious existences in sewn, perforated, segmented bodies or torsos.

== Exhibitions ==
- 2000: Chiusa City Museum
- 2003: Galerie Appel, Frankfurt am Main
- 2004: Steirischer Herbst, Galerie Tazl, Graz
- 2005: Galerie Chobot, Vienna
- 2008/09: with Alberto Giacometti - Sinclair-Haus, Bad Homburg; Käthe Kollwitz Museum, Berlin
- 2010: Gallery for Contemporary Art Leipzig
- 2011: Osthaus Museum Hagen, Altana Kulturstiftung, Hagen
- 2012: Sochi Art Museum, Russia
- 2012: 3rd Gherdeina Biennale, Ortisei, Val Gardena
- 2012: Rathausgalerie Brixen
- 2013: Kunsthaus Meran
- 2014: Albert Baumgarten Gallery, Freiburg im Breisgau
- 2015: Galerie Doris Ghetta, Ortisei, Val Gardena; Portraits, National Museum, New York
- 2017: Nzaul d'auter - Somewhere else, Museum Pfalzgalerie Kaiserslautern; Galleria Civica di Trento, Trento
- 2018: Sun plaza, Galerie Doris Ghetta, Val Gardena
- 2019: Behind the things, Hildesheim Cathedral Museum; Chobot Gallery, Vienna

== Bibliography ==
- Walter Moroder, mit einem Text von Peter Weiermair. Galerie Appel, Frankfurt am Main 2003.
- Claudia Guderian: Palmfruchtaugen und Dolomitenkreide. Ein Besuch im Atelier von Walter Moroder im Grödnertal In: Die Welt vom 21. August 2004.
- Hans-Joachim Müller: Walter Moroder, Wienand Verlag 2007. ISBN 3-87909-896-4.
- Hans-Joachim Müller: Walter Moroder. In: Künstler. Kritisches Lexikon der Gegenwartskunst, Ausgabe 82/Heft 11, München 2008.
- Andrea Firmenich (Hrsg.): Walter Moroder – Alberto Giacometti. Geheime Welt. Mit Texten von Hans-Peter Riese, Astrid Becker und Arnold Stadler. Altana Kulturstiftung, Bad Homburg/Wienand Verlag Köln 2008. ISBN 978-3-87909-958-0.
- Stephanie Huber: Walter Moroder: Material, Figur, Präsenz. Magisterarbeit am Institut für Kunstgeschichte der Johann Wolfgang Goethe-Universität Frankfurt am Main 2010.
- Walter Moroder. Mit einem Text von Valerio Dehò. Kunst Meran, Verlag Galerie Baumgarten 2014. ISBN 978-3-925223-52-5.
- Walter Moroder. Nzaul d’auter. Irgendwo anders. Mit Texten von Annette Reich und Denis Isaia. Museum Pfalzgalerie Kaiserslautern 2017. ISBN 978-3-89422-210-9.
- Claudia Höhl (Hrsg.): Walter Moroder. Hinter den Dingen. Mit Texten von Claudia Höhl und Hans-Peter Riese. Verlag Schnell & Steiner, Regensburg 2018. ISBN 978-3-7954-3357-4.
- Ferruccio Delle Cave: ver/orten. Kunst aus Südtirol – heute. Mit Fotografien von Ulrich Egger. Athesia Tappeiner Verlag, Bozen 2019.
