= Hans Kollwitz =

German physician (1892–1971)

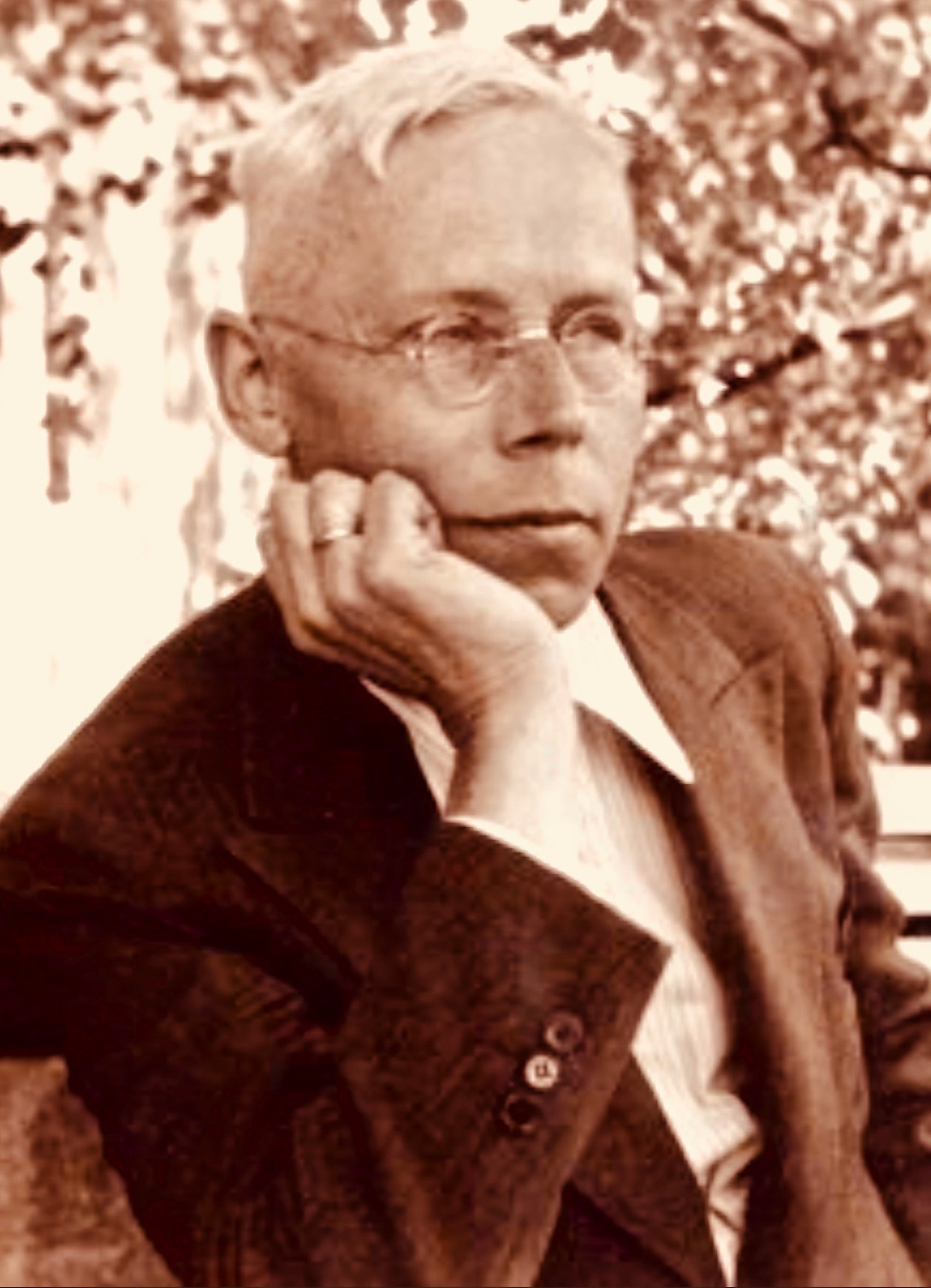
- Hans Kollwitz circa 1930
- Born: 14 May 1892; Berlin, German Empire
- Died: 22 September 1971 (aged 79); Lichtenrade, West Germany (now Germany)
- Military career
- Allegiance: German Empire
- Branch: Imperial German Army
- Service years: 1914–1918
- Conflicts: World War I
- Other work: Medicine; Psychotherapy; Epidemiology

Hans Kollwitz (14 May 1892 – 22 September 1971) was a German epidemiologist, eldest son of artist Käthe Kollwitz. He obtained his degree in medicine and psychotherapy in 1928. He was also a World War I veteran, in which he voluntarily served, after joining from the German Youth Movement where he was a Wandervogel.

== Biography ==
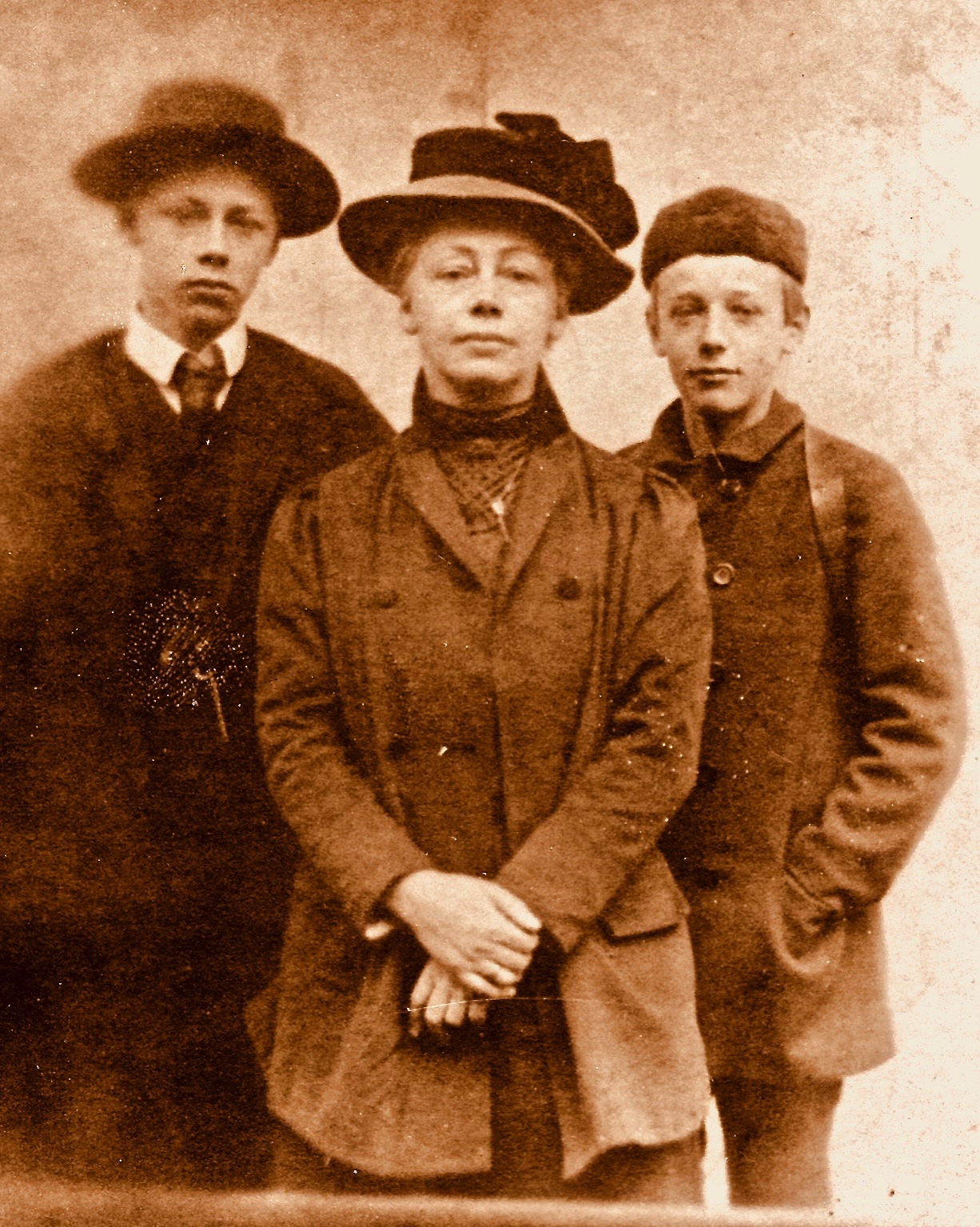
Hans Kollwitz with his mother Käthe Kollwitz and his younger brother Peter, 1909

Hans was born to Karl Kollwitz (1863–1940) and artist Käthe Kollwitz (1867–1945). At the outbreak of World War I, Hans voluntarily joined the Imperial German Army and served in the war. His younger brother, Peter, was killed in action in 1914 in Belgium.

In 1920 he married Otthilie Ehlers (1900–1963), who, like his mother, was also a graphic artist. Among other things, she also illustrated children's books and made woodcuts and wood engravings of predominantly East Prussian landscapes. Together they had one son Peter (1921–1942) and two daughters, Jutta and Jordis in 1923 and son Arne in 1930. His son Peter was killed in action in 1942 in World War II on the Eastern Front in Russia at the age of 21. He had been named in memory of Hans's younger brother, who died at the age of 18 in World War I.

After his graduation, he moved to Lichtenrade, which was particularly hard hit by air raids on Nazi Germany on 3 December 1943. The house of the Kollwitz family was badly damaged and was no longer habitable afterwards.

He never joined the Nazi Party and served in the health administration after World War II.

== Publications ==
- Beitrag zur Kenntnis der Insuffizientia vertebrae. Med. Diss., o. V., Berlin 1920. OCLC 71891713
- Käthe Kollwitz. Tagebuchblätter und Briefe. ebr. Mann, Berlin 1948. OCLC 920745963
- Käthe Kollwitz. Bertelsmann, Gütersloh 1956. Hrsg.: Werner Schumann
- Käthe Kollwitz: Aus meinem Leben. List, München 1958. OCLC 258701833
- Käthe Kollwitz 1867–1945. Briefe der Freundschaft und Begegnungen. List, Munich 1966. OCLC 607678737
- Käthe Kollwitz (1867–1967). Inter Nationes, Bad Godesberg 1967. OCLC 474076817
- Käthe Kollwitz. Das plastische Werk. Fotos von Max Jacoby. Mit einem Vorwort von Leopold Reidemeister. Wegner, Hamburg 1967. OCLC 634294771
- Käthe Kollwitz. Ich sah die Welt mit liebevollen Blicken. Ein Leben in Selbstzeugnissen. Fackelträger-Verlag Schmidt-Küster, Hannover 1968. OCLC 830723383
