= Karl Kollwitz =

German physician

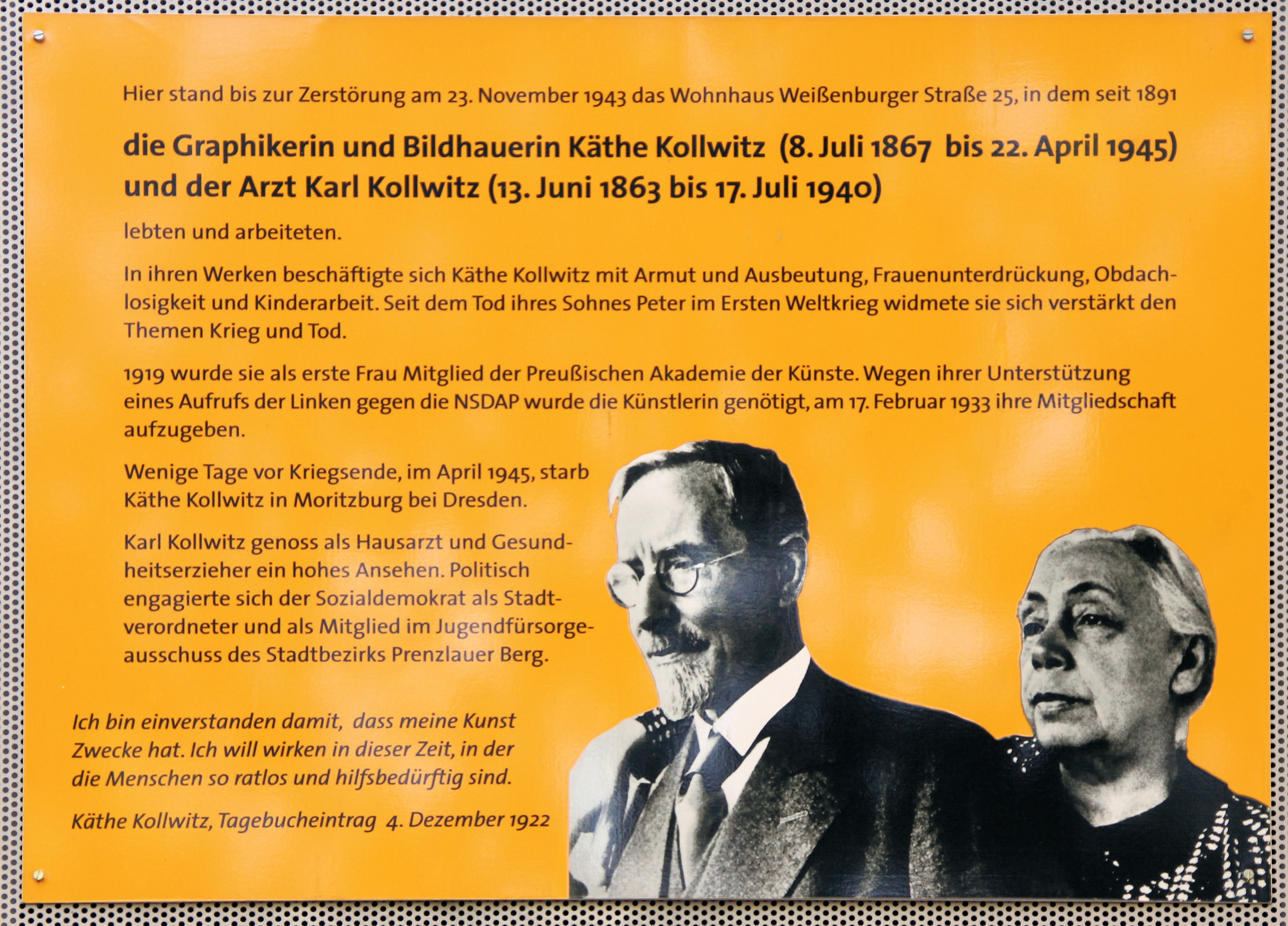
Memorial plaque to Karl and Käthe Kollwitz at the house Kollwitzstraße 58, in Berlin-Prenzlauer Berg

Karl Kollwitz (13 June 1863 – 19 July 1940) was a German physician who was known for his medical services to the poor in Berlin.

== Biography ==
Johannes Carl August Kollwitz was born in to a large family where he and his sister Lisbeth were the only his parents' nine children. After the father's early death his mother sent her nine-year-old son to one of the Königsberg orphanages, from which Karl Kollwitz later attended the Royal Wilhelm Gymnasium in Königsberg. Despite his mother's death and him becoming an orphan at the age of fifteen, Kollwitz was able to graduate from high school, enter the University of Königsberg, receive a medical education and a doctorate degree.

After his marriage in 1891 to the artist Käthe Schmidt, Karl moved with her to Berlin, where he opened his medical practice in the Prenzlauer Berg area. According to his wife, his home reception room was filled with the poor proletarian strata of Berlin.

Karl Kollwitz ran his statutory health insurance practice as a doctor for the poor. In 1913, Kollwitz and his colleagues Ernst Simmel and Ignaz Zadek founded the Social Democratic Association of Doctors (later the Society of Socialist Physicians). He was a member of the youth welfare committee in the Prenzlauer Berg district and in the German League for Human Rights. After the November Revolution in 1919, he became involved in Berlin local politics as a city councilor for the SPD and later as a member of the Internationaler Sozialistischer Kampfbund.

After his death in 1940, Karl Kollwitz was buried in the family grave at the Friedrichsfelde Central Cemetery, next to his brother-in-law Conrad Schmidt and his wife Anna. Käthe Kollwitz also later found her final resting place there.

== Works ==
- Bemerkungen zum Tuberkulosekongress. In: Socialistische Monatshefte. 3 = 5(1899), Heft 6, S. 300–303. fes.de
- Aerzte und Krankencassen. In: Socialistische Monatshefte. 7 = 9(1903), Heft 8, S. 603–608. fes.de
- Ärzte und Krankenkassen. In: Sozialistische Monatshefte. 19(1913), Heft 4, S. 222–232. Digitalisat
- Gemeinschatsarbeit der Ärzte und Krankenkassen. fes.de der Ärzte und Krankenkassen. In: Sozialistische Monatshefte. 27(1921), Heft 4, S. 187–192. fes.de
- Die kritische Lage der Krankenversicherung. In: Sozialistische Monatshefte. 29(1923), Heft 12, S. 725–729. fes.de
- Widerstreitende Bestrebungen auf dem Gebiet des Gesundheitswesens. In: Sozialistische Monatshefte. 30(1924), Heft 12, S. 760–766. fes.de

== Memory ==
The health center built in 1983 in Berlin on Prenzlauer Allee near the planetarium in Ernst-Thälmann-Park was named "Poliklinik Dr. Karl Kollwitz". After reunification, the building was acquired by the Sana Group, which had it extensively renovated but kept the name.

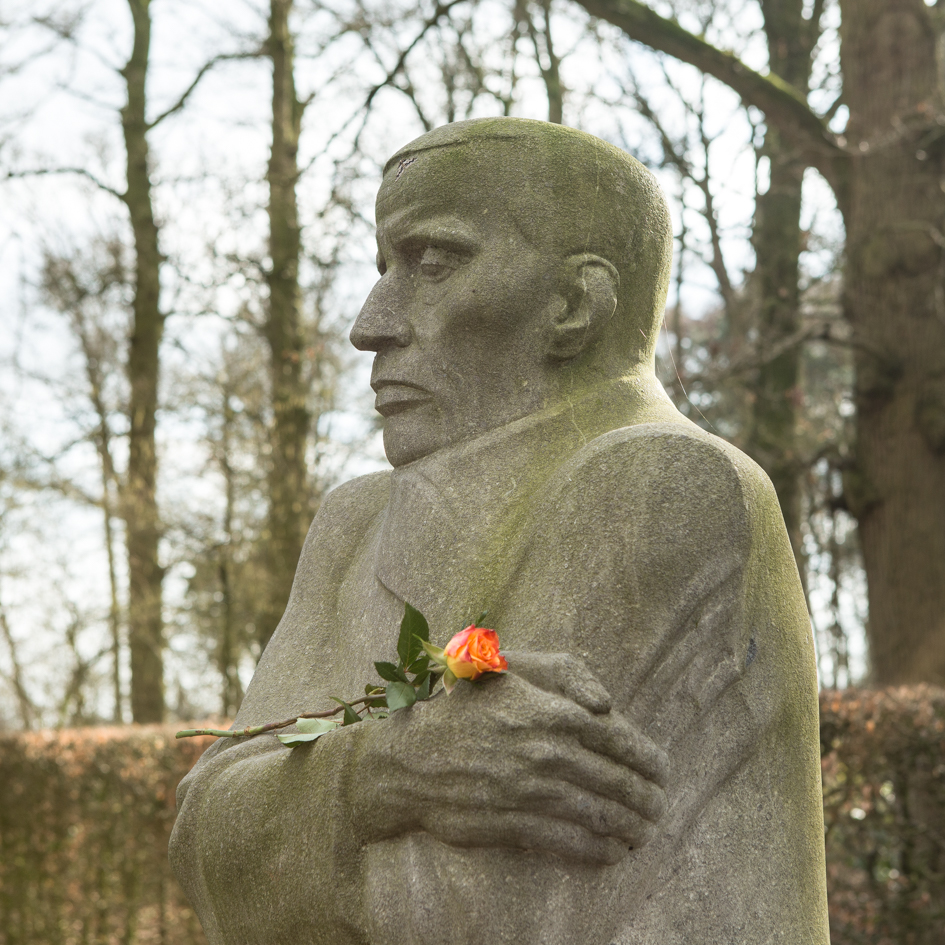
The facial features of Karl Kollwitz adorn a figure of the “Mourning Parents” created by Käthe Kollwitz at the German military cemetery in Vladslo, West Flanders

The former Weißenburger Straße, where the Kollwitz family's house stood, was renamed Kollwitzstraße in 1947 in honor of Käthe Kollwitz, and Wörther Platz was renamed Kollwitzplatz. On April 22, 2005, the Pankow district office had a commemorative plaque affixed to the house where Karl Kollwitz had lived until his death.
