= Woman with Dead Child =

1903 etching by Käthe Kollwitz

Woman with Dead Child (Frau mit totem Kind)
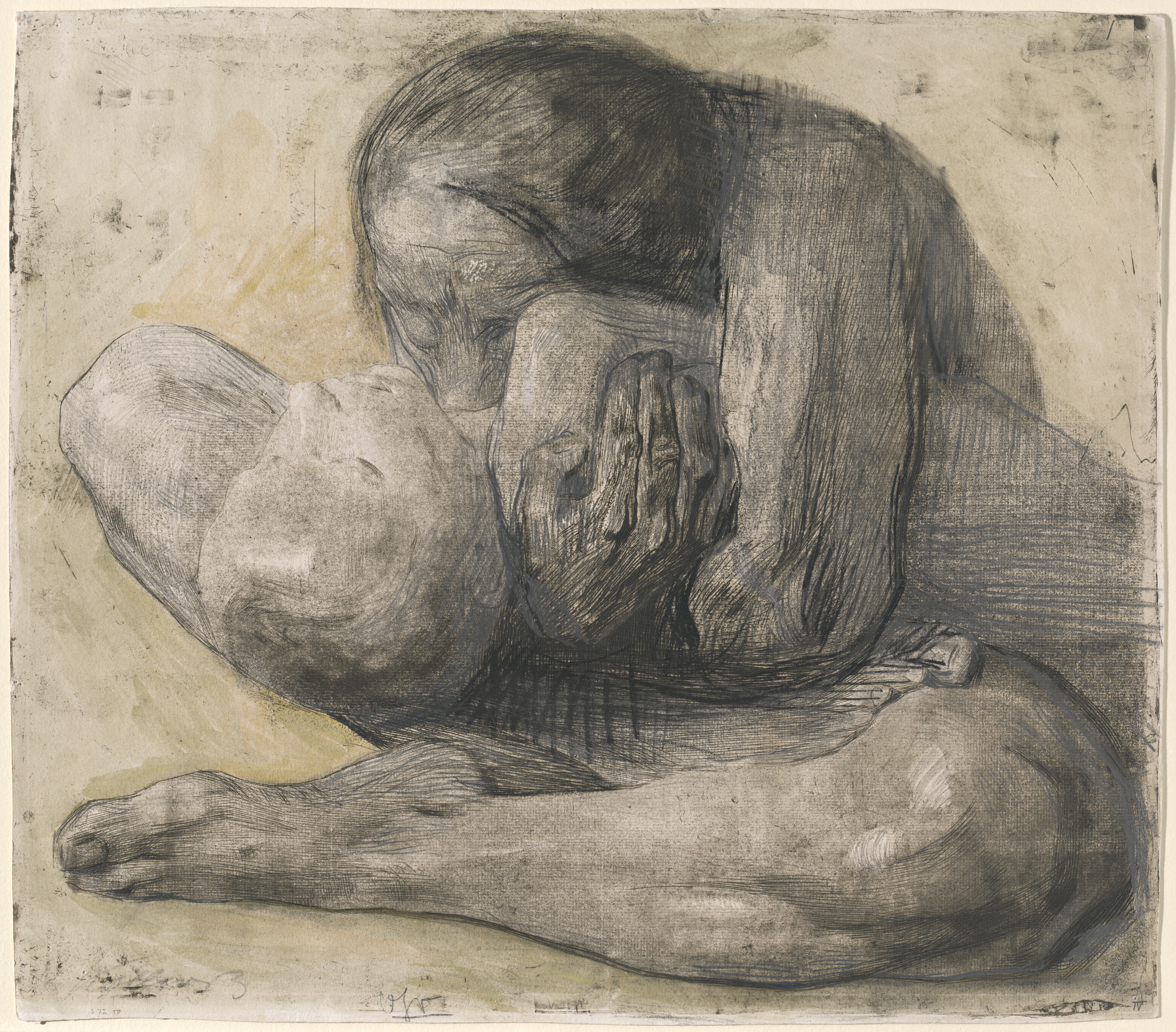
- Artist: Käthe Kollwitz
- Year: 1903
- Medium: etching
- Movement: Expressionism
- Dimensions: 54.5 cm × 70.3 cm (21.5 in × 27.7 in)

Woman With Dead Child is a 1903 etching by Käthe Kollwitz. Its subject was influenced by her experiences in an underserved sector of Berlin as a physician's wife where disease and infant mortality rate were high. The image is often considered as Kollwitz's most famous depiction of war.

== Content ==
The picture depicts a mother holding her child between the thighs. Her mouth is fixed on its chest in an effort to suck her child back inside her.

The artist used herself and her seven-year-old son Peter as models for this composition.
