= Conrad Schmidt (economist) =

German economist, journalist and philosopher (1863–1932)

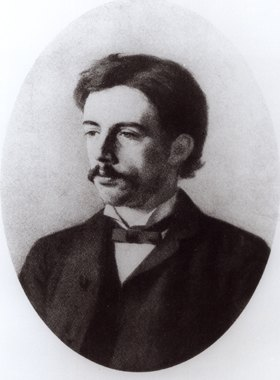
Schmidt c. 1885.

Conrad Schmidt (25 November 1863 – 14 October 1932) was a German economist, philosopher, and journalist of the Social Democratic Party (SPD).

== Biography ==
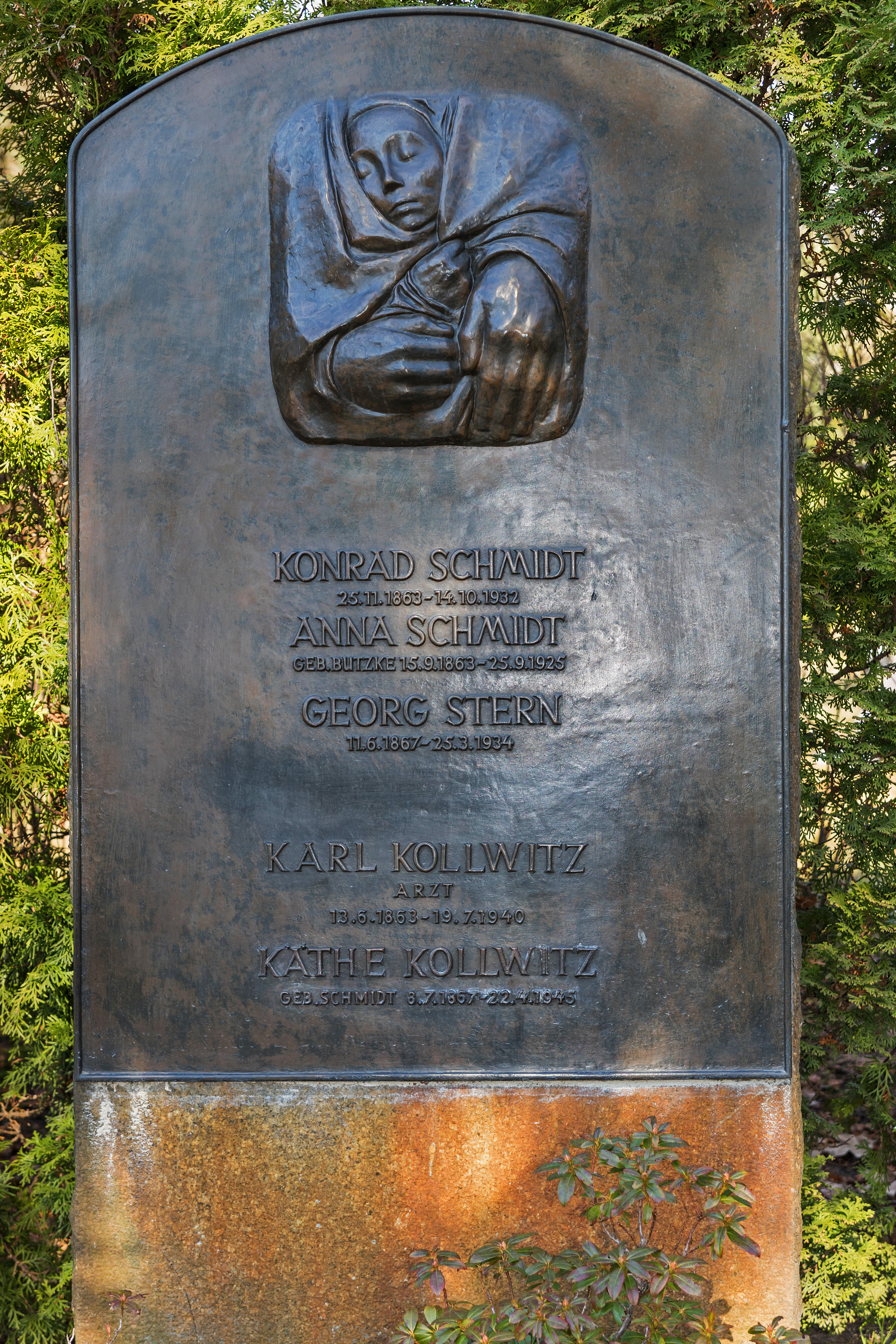
Schmidt-Kollwitz grave in Berlin

Conrad Schmidt was born into a family active in the SPD. He was the older brother of the painter Käthe Kollwitz. In the mid-1880s, he studied in Berlin and in 1887 he defended his doctoral dissertation in Leipzig on "Natural Wages", in which he compared the theories of wages and exploitation of Johann Karl Rodbertus and Karl Marx. Schmidt dismissed Marx's theory as an unproven hypothesis in favor of Rodbertus' theory, which was based on the recognition of natural rights. However, after a closer examination of Marx's writings, Schmidt revised his sentence and became an adherent of Marxism.

Schmidt dealt with the transformation problem that Friedrich Engels described in 1885 in the preface to the second volume of Das Kapital. Schmidt proposed his solution to Engels; with the support of Engels and Karl Kautsky, he published in 1889 the work "Average Profit Based on Marx's Law of Value". He became close to Engels and often spent evenings at his house. Schmidt and Engels maintained a lively correspondence. Engels' letter to Schmidt on 27 October 1890, is considered an important document in the history of Marxism.

In 1890, on the advice of Engels, Schmidt accepted a position as editor of the Swiss newspaper Züricher Post. Schmidt turned on what he perceived to be economic determinism in Engels' position and switched to neo-Kantian positions. He emphasized the ethical aspects of the labor movement such as sacrifice, consciousness and party loyalty. According to Schmidt, these qualities arise from the primary animal superegoistic instincts that are formed in every living being in the course of evolution to preserve the species and become more conscious and rational in humans in order to be realized in the working class. The philosophical works of Schmidt, in which he proposed to combine Marxism with the philosophy of Immanuel Kant, served as an ideological source of Marxist revisionism espoused by Eduard Bernstein.

Since Schmidt saw no possibility of an academic career in Switzerland for himself, he returned to Berlin in 1895, where he worked for the social democratic weekly newspaper Vorwärts. He was chairman of the Freie Volksbühne from 1897 to 1918. In 1919, Konrad Haenisch appointed him professor at the Berlin Polylitechnikum. Schmidt and his wife Anna were buried in the artists' department of Berlin's Friedrichsfelde Central Cemetery. His sister Käthe Kollwitz created the tombstone.
