= Käthe Kollwitz House (Moritzburg) =

Museum in Moritzburg, Germany, dedicated to the artist Käthe Kollwitz

Coordinates: 51°09′58″N 13°40′29″E

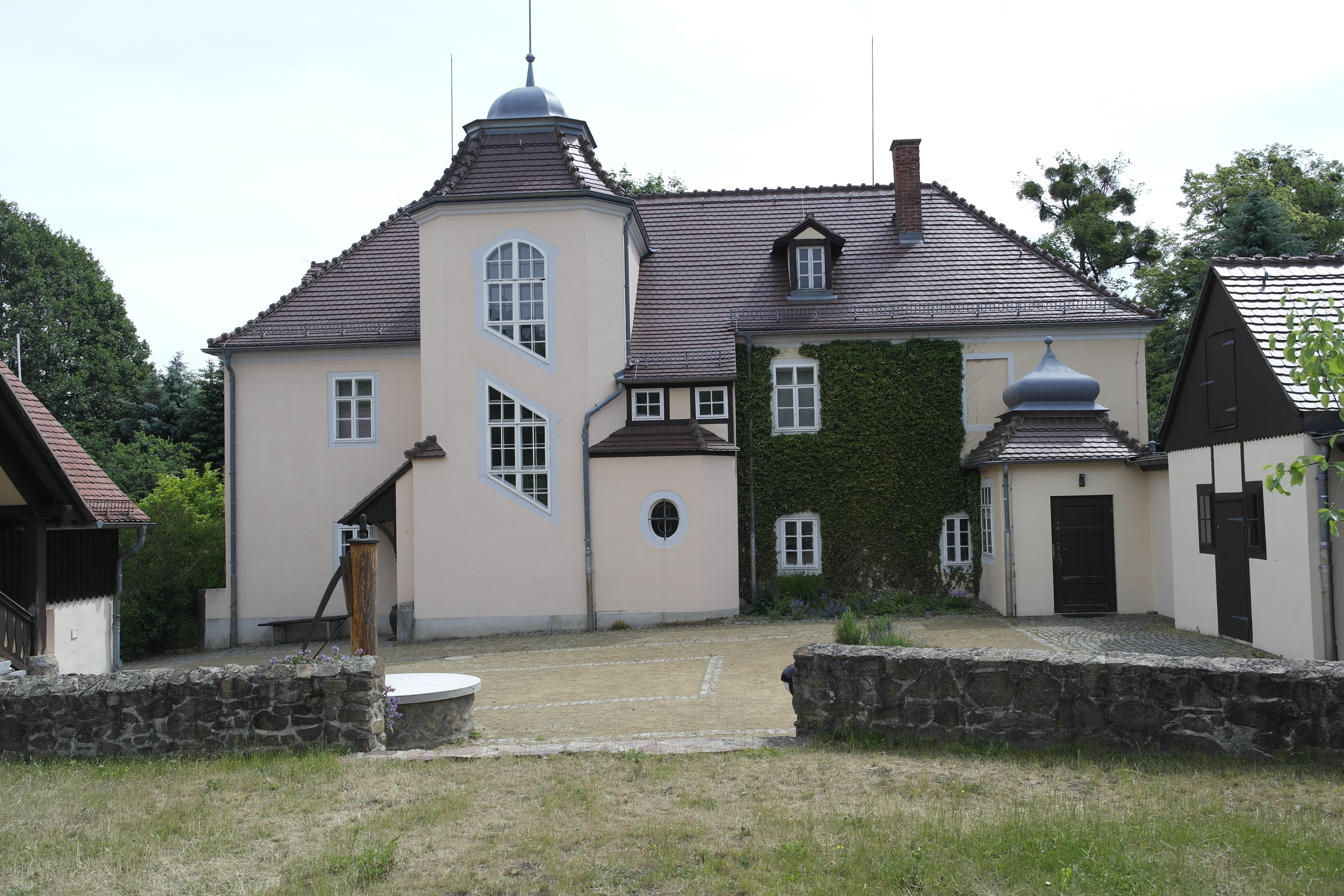
Käthe-Kollwitz-Haus

The Käthe Kollwitz House (German: Käthe-Kollwitz-Haus) in Moritzburg, Saxony, is one of three museums in Germany dedicated to the artist Käthe Kollwitz (1867—1945), the other two being the Käthe Kollwitz Museums in Cologne and Berlin.

== Background ==
The house in Moritzburg is where Käthe Kollwitz lived her final months, from August 1944 until her death on 22 April 1945. It was decided already in 1945 that the house was to be turned into a memorial of her, but it was not until in the 50th anniversary of her death that the museum was opened, on 22 April 1995.

== The permanent Käthe Kollwitz exhibition ==
The museum's collection of works is not as big as the ones in Cologne or Berlin. Here the focus of the exhibition is more on the artist herself. The exhibition is arranged chronologically through seven rooms, presenting the artist's works in parallel with her biography, with photographs, excerpts from her diary and letters.

== Temporary exhibitions and printing workshop ==
The museum also have temporary art exhibitions, either exploring a special theme in the works of Käthe Kollwitz or presenting contemporary artists. There is also a printing workshop for those interested in learning more about etching and the use of a printing press.

== See also ==
- List of single-artist museums
