= Käthe Kollwitz =

German artist (1867–1945)

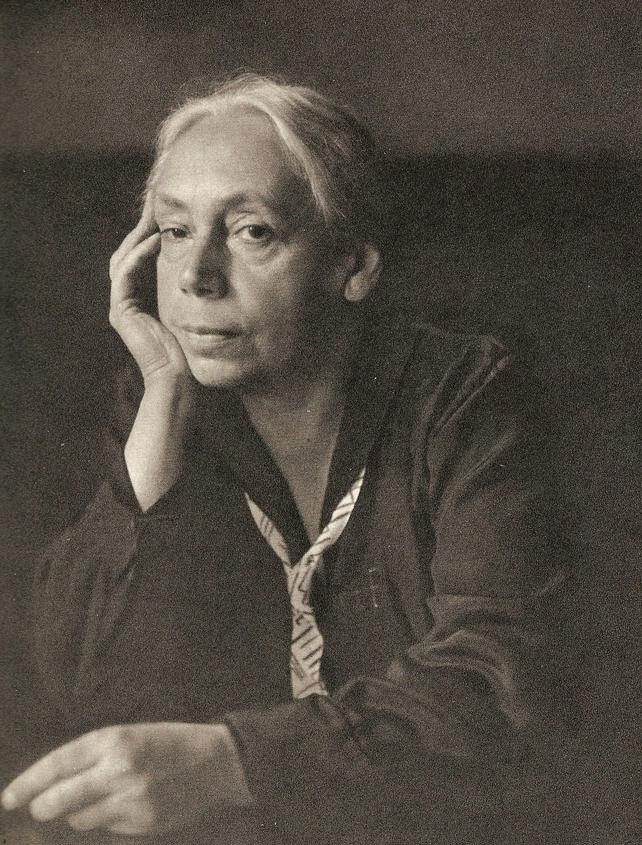
- Kollwitz in 1927
- Born: Käthe Schmidt; 8 July 1867; Königsberg, Prussia, North German Confederation
- Died: 22 April 1945 (aged 77); Moritzburg, Saxony, Nazi Germany
- Resting place: Zentralfriedhof Friedrichsfelde
- Movement: Expressionism
- Spouse: Karl Kollwitz
- Children: 2 (including Hans)
- Relatives: Conrad Schmidt (brother); Johanna Hofer (niece); Maria Matray (niece)
- Awards: Pour Le Mérite 1929

Käthe Kollwitz (German pronunciation: [kɛːtə kɔlvɪt͡s] born Schmidt; 8 July 1867 – 22 April 1945) was a German artist who worked with painting, printmaking (including etching, lithography and woodcuts) and sculpture. Her most famous art cycles, including The Weavers and The Peasant War, depict the effects of poverty, hunger and war on the working class. Her early work was realistic, but became freer in later years. Kollwitz was the first woman not only to be elected to the Prussian Academy of Arts but also to receive honorary professor status.

== Early life ==
Kollwitz was born in Königsberg, Prussia, as the fifth child in her family. Her father, Karl Schmidt, was a Social Democrat who became a mason and house builder. Her mother, Katherina Schmidt, was the daughter of Julius Rupp, a Lutheran pastor who was expelled from the official Evangelical State Church and founded an independent congregation. Her education and her art were greatly influenced by her grandfather's lessons in religion and socialism. Her older brother Conrad became a prominent economist of the SPD.

Recognizing her talent, Kollwitz's father arranged for her to begin lessons in drawing and copying plaster casts on 14 August 1879 when she was twelve. In 1885-6 she began her formal study of art under the direction of Karl Stauffer-Bern, a friend of the artist Max Klinger, at the School for Women Artists in Berlin. At sixteen she began working with subjects associated with the Realism movement, making drawings of working people, sailors and peasants she saw in her father's offices. The etchings of Klinger, their technique and social concerns, were an inspiration to Kollwitz.

In 1888/89, she studied painting with Ludwig Herterich in Munich, where she realized her strength was not as a painter, but a draughtsman. When she was seventeen, her brother Konrad introduced her to Karl Kollwitz, a medical student. Thereafter, Kathe became engaged to Karl, while she was studying art in Munich. In 1890, she returned to Königsberg, rented her first studio, and continued to depict the harsh labors of the working class. These subjects were an inspiration in her work for years.

In 1891, Kollwitz married Karl, who by this time was a doctor tending to the poor in Berlin. The couple moved into the large apartment that would be Kollwitz's home until it was destroyed in World War II. The proximity of her husband's practice proved invaluable:

"The motifs I was able to select from this milieu (the workers' lives) offered me, in a simple and forthright way, what I discovered to be beautiful.... People from the bourgeois sphere were altogether without appeal or interest. All middle-class life seemed pedantic to me. On the other hand, I felt the proletariat had guts. It was not until much later...when I got to know the women who would come to my husband for help, and incidentally also to me, that I was powerfully moved by the fate of the proletariat and everything connected with its way of life.... But what I would like to emphasize once more is that compassion and commiseration were at first of very little importance in attracting me to the representation of proletarian life; what mattered was simply that I found it beautiful."

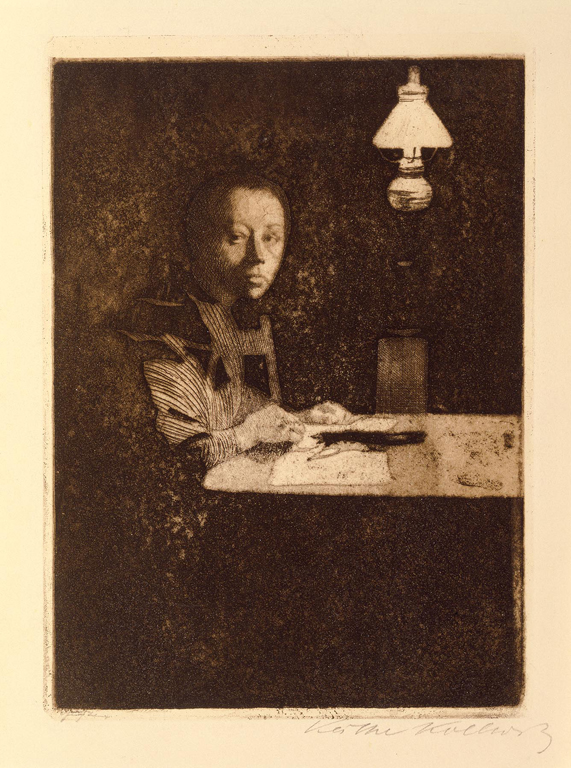
Self-Portrait at the Table (1893). Print. This example housed at the Milwaukee Art Museum.

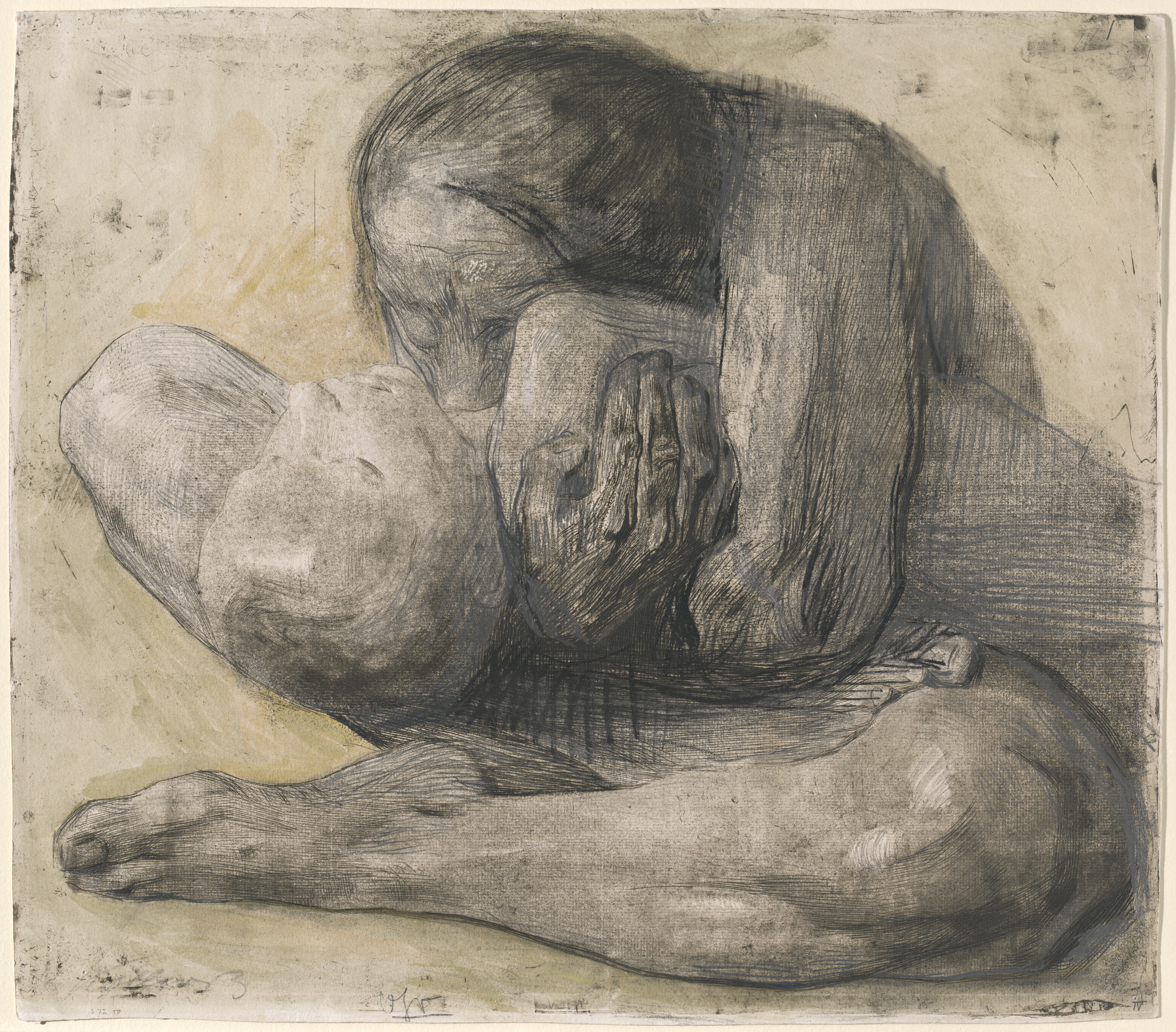
Woman with Dead Child, 1903 etching

=== Personal health ===
It is believed Kollwitz suffered anxiety during her childhood due to the death of her siblings, including the death of her younger brother, Benjamin. More recent research suggests that Kollwitz may have suffered from a childhood neurological disorder dysmetropsia (sometimes called Alice in Wonderland syndrome, due to its sensory hallucinations and migraines).

== Career ==
=== The Weavers ===
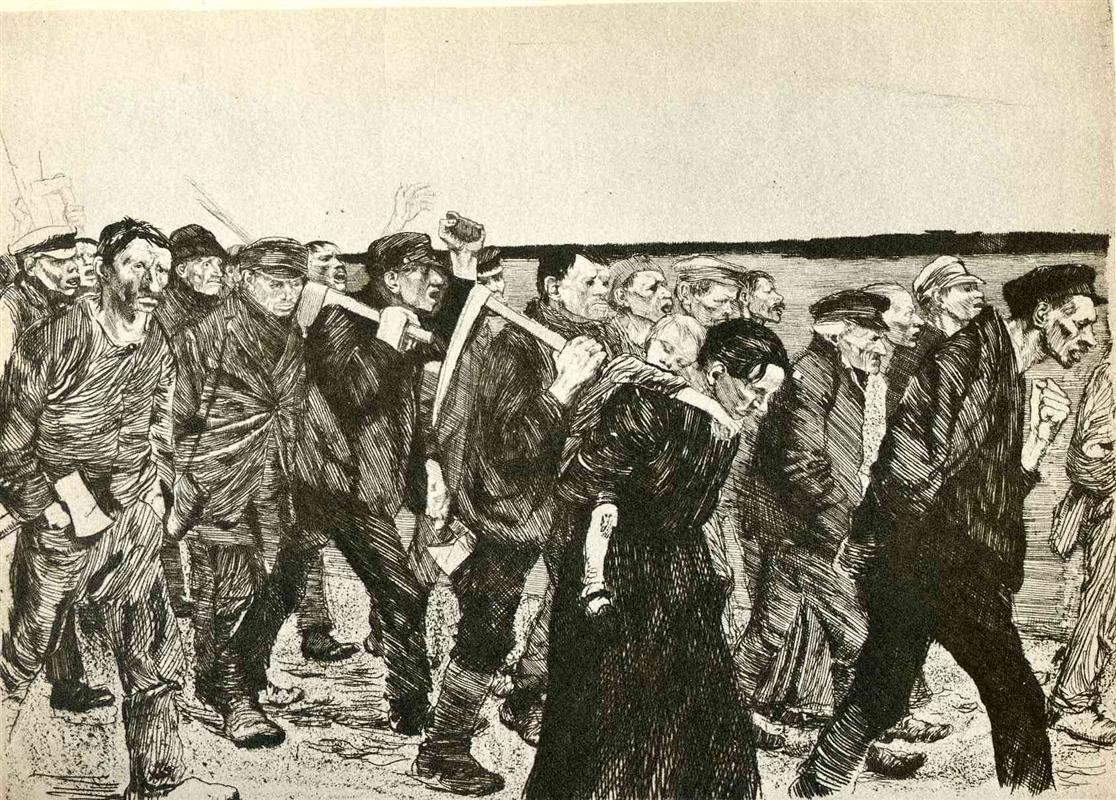
The March of the Weavers in Berlin

Between the births of her sons – Hans in 1892 and Peter in 1896 – Kollwitz saw a performance of Gerhart Hauptmann's The Weavers, which dramatized the oppression of the Silesian weavers in Langenbielau and their failed revolt in 1844. Kollwitz was inspired by the performance and ceased work on a series of etchings she had intended to illustrate Émile Zola's Germinal. She produced a cycle of six works on the weavers theme, three lithographs (Poverty, Death, and Conspiracy) and three etchings with aquatint and sandpaper (March of the Weavers, Riot, and The End). Not a literal illustration of the drama, nor an idealization of workers, the prints expressed the workers' misery, hope, courage, and eventually, doom.

The cycle was exhibited publicly in 1898 to wide acclaim. But when Adolph Menzel nominated her work for the gold medal of the Great Berlin Art Exhibition of 1898 in Berlin, Kaiser Wilhelm II withheld his approval, saying "I beg you gentlemen, a medal for a woman, that would really be going too far . . . orders and medals of honour belong on the breasts of worthy men." Nevertheless, The Weavers became Kollwitz's most widely acclaimed work.

=== Peasant War ===
Kollwitz's second major cycle of works was the Peasant War. The production of this series lasted from 1902 to 1908 due to many preliminary drawings and discarded ideas in lithography. It was inspired by the German Peasants' War of 1524–1525, when oppressed peasants in southern Germany took up arms against the nobility and the Church. As with The Weavers, this body of work may have been influenced by a Hauptmann play, Florian Geyer (1895). However, the initial source of Kollwitz's interest dated to her youth when she and her brother Konrad playfully imagined themselves as barricade fighters in a revolution. Not only did Kollwitz have a childhood connection, but an artistic connection as well. She was an advocate for those without a voice and liked to portray the working class in a way no one else saw. The artist identified with the character of Black Anna, a woman cited as a protagonist in the uprising. When completed, the Peasant War consisted of seven etchings: Plowing, Raped, Sharpening the Scythe, Arming in the Vault, Charge, The Prisoners, and After the Battle. After the Battle is described as eerily premonitory as it features a mother searching for her son's body in the night. In all, the works were technically more impressive than those of The Weavers, owing to their greater size and dramatic command of light and shadow. They are Kollwitz's highest achievements as an etcher.

Kollwitz visited Paris twice while working on Peasant War and took classes at the Académie Julian in 1904 to learn to sculpt. The etching Outbreak was awarded the Villa Romana Prize. This prize provided a year's stay in 1907 in a studio in Florence. Although Kollwitz completed no work there, she later recalled the impact of early Renaissance art she experienced during her time in Florence.

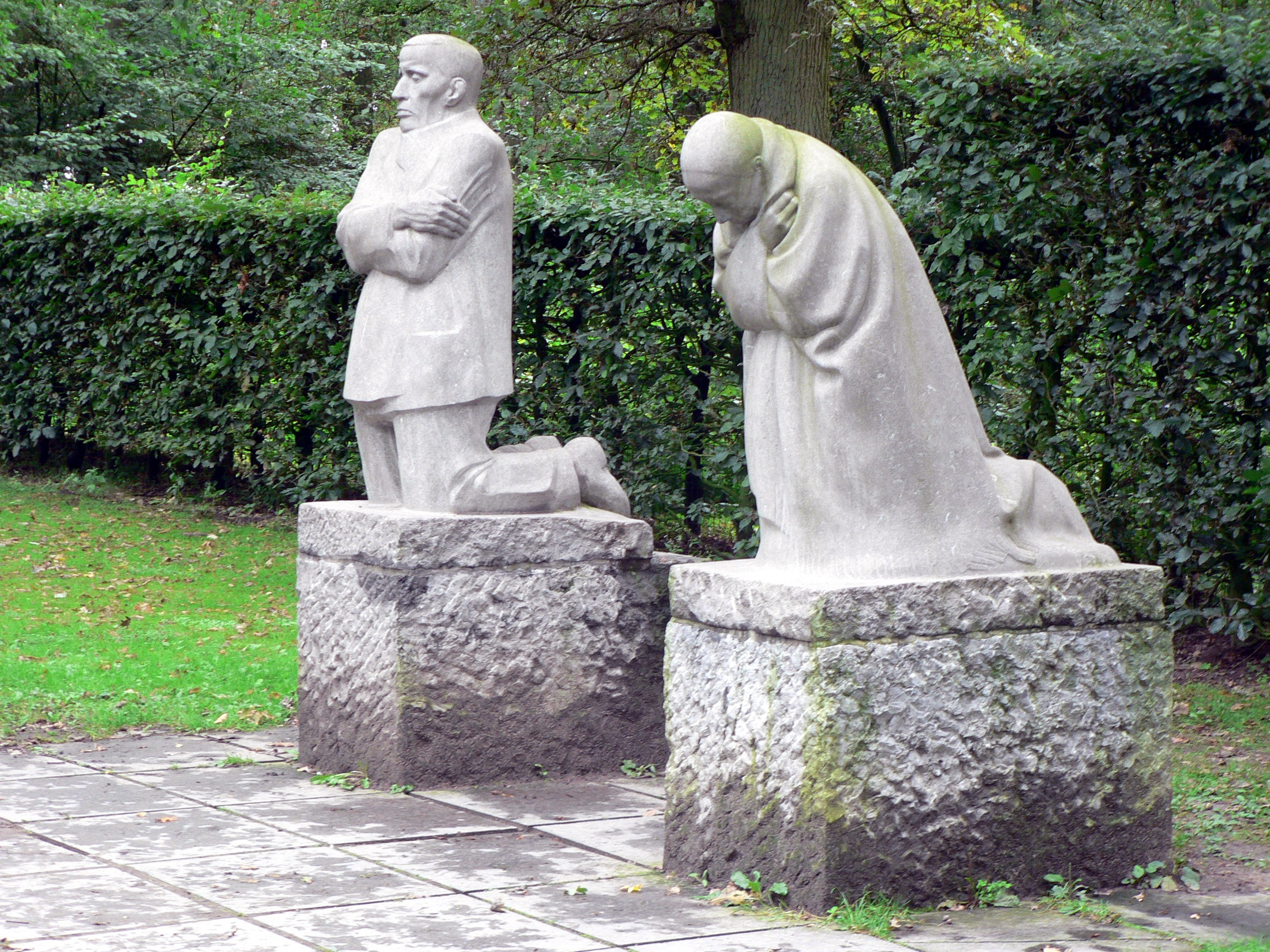
The Grieving Parents, a memorial to Kollwitz's son Peter, in Vladslo German war cemetery, Belgium

=== Modernism and World War I ===
After her return to Germany, Kollwitz continued to exhibit her work but was impressed by younger compatriots. Expressionists and (after the First World War) Bauhaus artists inspired Kollwitz to simplify her means of expression. Subsequent works such as Runover, 1910, and Self-Portrait, 1912, show this new direction. She also continued to work on sculpture.

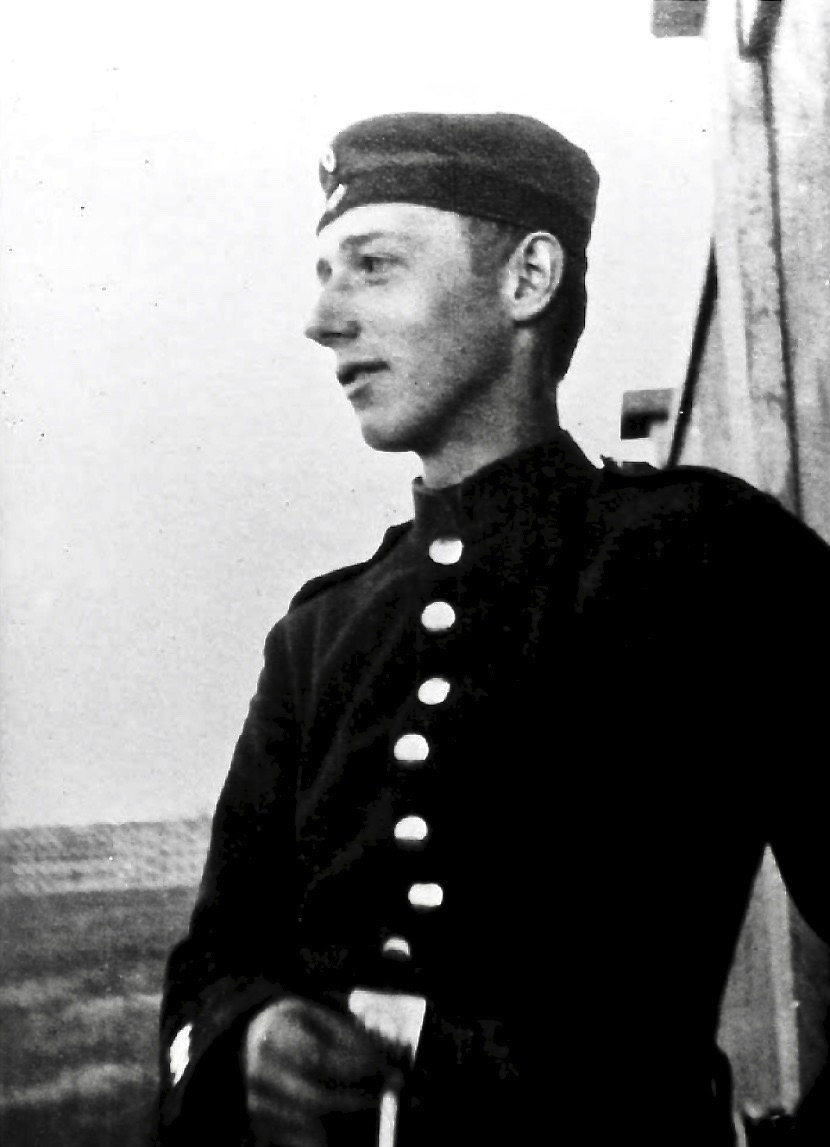
Peter Kollwitz as German soldier, 2 October 1914

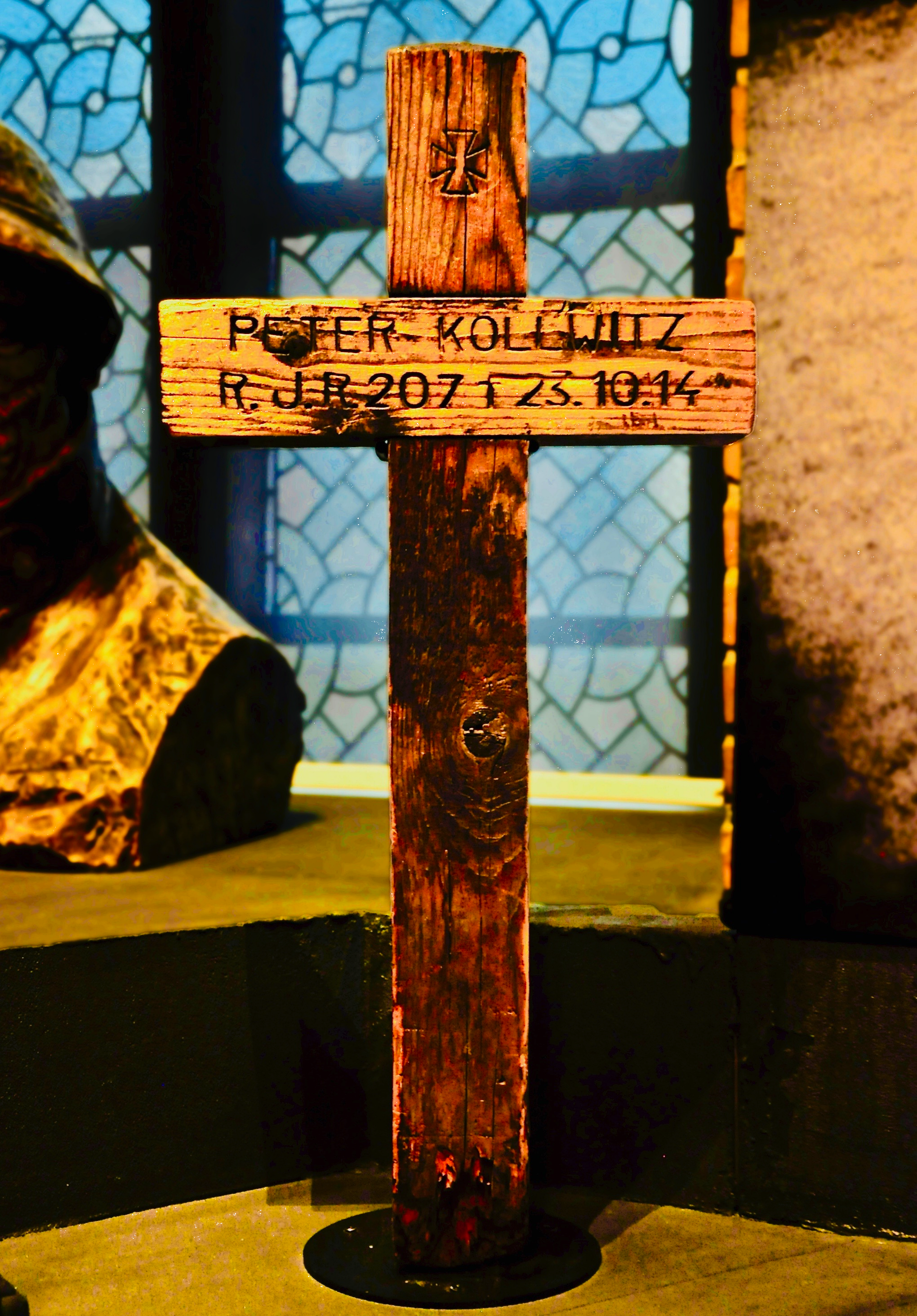
Grave cross of Peter Kollwitz at the In Flanders Fields Museum

Kollwitz lost her younger son, Peter, on the battlefield in World War I in October 1914. The loss of her child began a stage of prolonged depression in her life. By the end of 1914 she had made drawings for a monument to Peter and his fallen comrades. She destroyed the monument in 1919 and began again in 1925. The memorial, titled The Grieving Parents, was finally completed and placed in the Belgian cemetery of Roggevelde in 1932. Later, when Peter's grave was moved to the nearby Vladslo German war cemetery, the statues were also moved.

"We [women] are endowed with the strength to make sacrifices which are more painful than giving our own blood. Consequently, we are able to see our own [men] fight and die when it is for the sake of freedom."

In 1917, on her 50th birthday, the galleries of Paul Cassirer provided a retrospective exhibition of one hundred and fifty drawings by Kollwitz.

Kollwitz was a committed socialist and pacifist, who was eventually attracted to communism. She expressed her political and social sympathies in her woodcut print, "memorial sheet for Karl Liebknecht" and in her involvement with the Arbeitsrat für Kunst, a part of the Social Democratic government in the first few weeks after the war. As the war wound down and a nationalistic appeal was made for old men and children to join the fighting, Kollwitz implored in a published statement:

There has been enough of dying! Let not another man fall!

While working on the sheet for Karl Liebknecht, she found etching insufficient for expressing monumental ideas. After viewing woodcuts by Ernst Barlach at the Secession exhibitions, she completed the Liebknecht sheet in the new medium and made about 30 woodcuts by 1926.

In 1919 Kollwitz was appointed to the position of professor at the Prussian Academy of Arts, the first woman to hold that position. Membership entailed a regular income, a large studio, and a full professorship. In 1933, the Nazi government forced her to resign from this position.

In 1928 she was also named director of the Master Class for Graphic Arts at the Prussian Academy. However, this title would soon be stripped after the Nazi regime rose to power.

=== War (Krieg) ===
In the years after World War I, her reaction to the war found a continuous outlet. In 1922–23 she produced the cycle War in woodcut form, including the works The Sacrifice, The Volunteers, The Parents, The Widow I, The Widow II, The Mothers, and The People. Much of this art was inspired by pro-war propaganda which she and Otto Dix riffed on to create anti-war propaganda. Kollwitz wanted to show the horrors of living through a war to combat the pro-war sentiment that had begun to grow in Germany again. In 1924 she finished her three most famous posters: Germany's Children Starving, Bread, and Never Again War ("Nie Wieder Krieg").

=== Death Cycle ===
Working now in a smaller studio, in the mid-1930s she completed her last major cycle of lithographs, Death, which consisted of eight stones: Woman Welcoming Death, Death with Girl in Lap, Death Reaches for a Group of Children, Death Struggles with a Woman, Death on the Highway, Death as a Friend, Death in the Water, and The Call of Death.

=== Seed Corn Must Not Be Ground (1942) ===
When Richard Dehmel called for more soldiers to fight in World War I in 1918, Kollwitz wrote an impassioned letter to the newspaper he published his call in, stating that there should be no more war, and that "seed corn must not be ground" in reference to young soldiers who were dying in the war. In 1942, she made a piece by the same name, this time in reaction to World War II. The work shows a mother, arms cast over three young children to protect them.

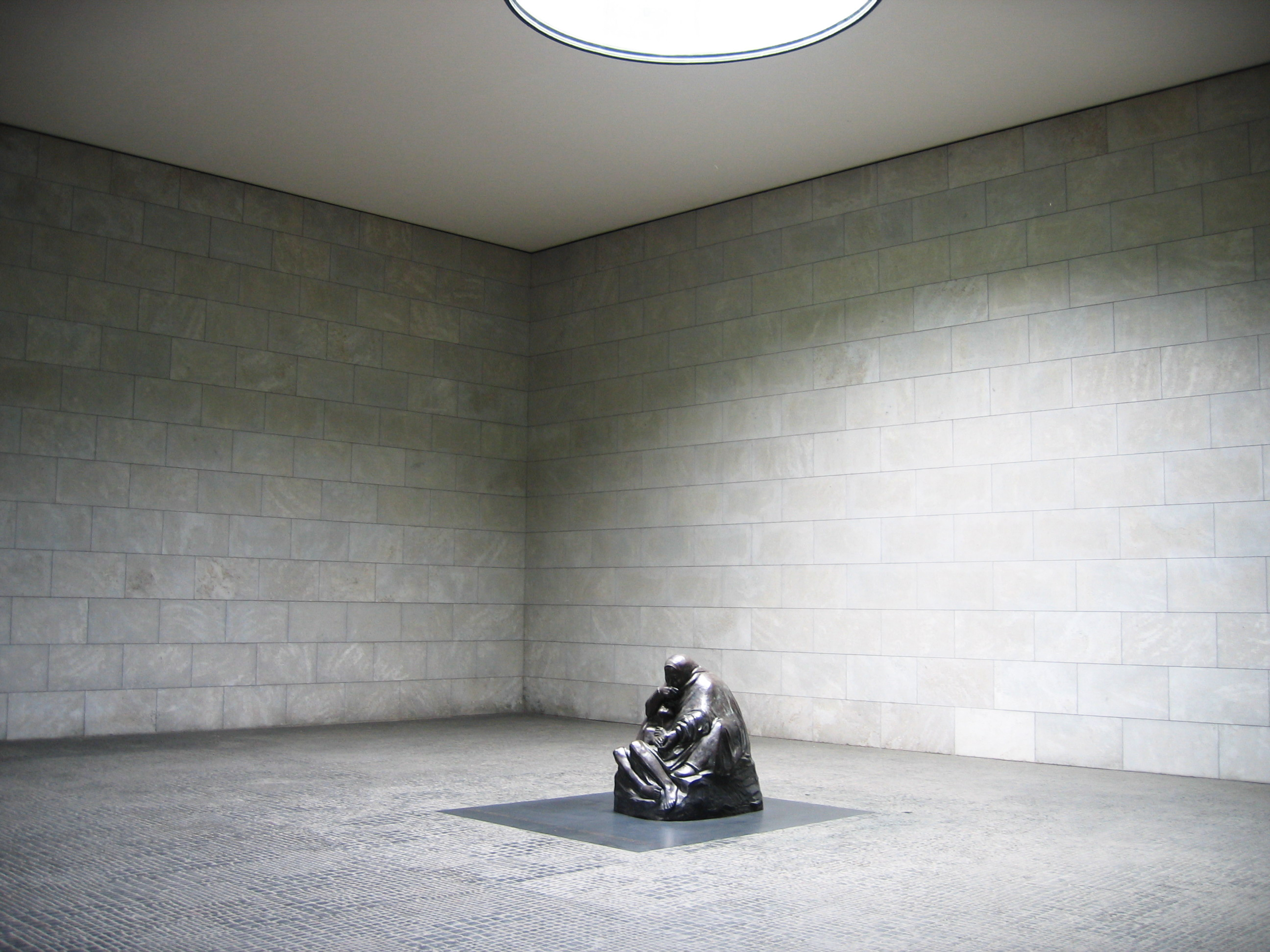
The interior of Neue Wache in Berlin, with Käthe Kollwitz's sculpture Mother with her Dead Son – centerpiece of what is today a memorial to "victims of war and dictatorship".

=== Later life and World War II ===
In 1933, after the establishment of the National-Socialist regime, the Nazi Party authorities forced her to resign her place on the faculty of the Akademie der Künste following her support of the Dringender Appell. Her work was removed from museums. Although she was banned from exhibiting, one of her "mother and child" pieces was used by the Nazis for propaganda.

"They give themselves with jubilation; they give themselves like a bright, pure flame ascending straight to heaven."

In July 1936, she and her husband were visited by the Gestapo, who threatened her with arrest and deportation to a Nazi concentration camp; they resolved to commit suicide if such a prospect became inevitable. However, Kollwitz was by now a figure of international note, and no further action was taken.

On her 70th birthday, she "received over 150 telegrams from leading personalities of the art world," as well as offers to house her in the United States, which she declined for fear of provoking reprisals against her family.

She outlived her husband (who died from an illness in 1940) and her grandson Peter, who died in action in World War II two years later.

In 1942, The Contemporary Art Society of Australia mounted its "Anti-Fascist Exhibition" displaying two lithographs and etchings by Kollwitz and including in the catalogue a print of her 1919 lithograph "The Mothers". The catalogue also paid tribute to her in a biography which stated, "Nazism paid her the compliment of banning her work and including it in its notorious exhibition of 'Degenerate Art', which in fact represented the greatest glories of German democratic art."

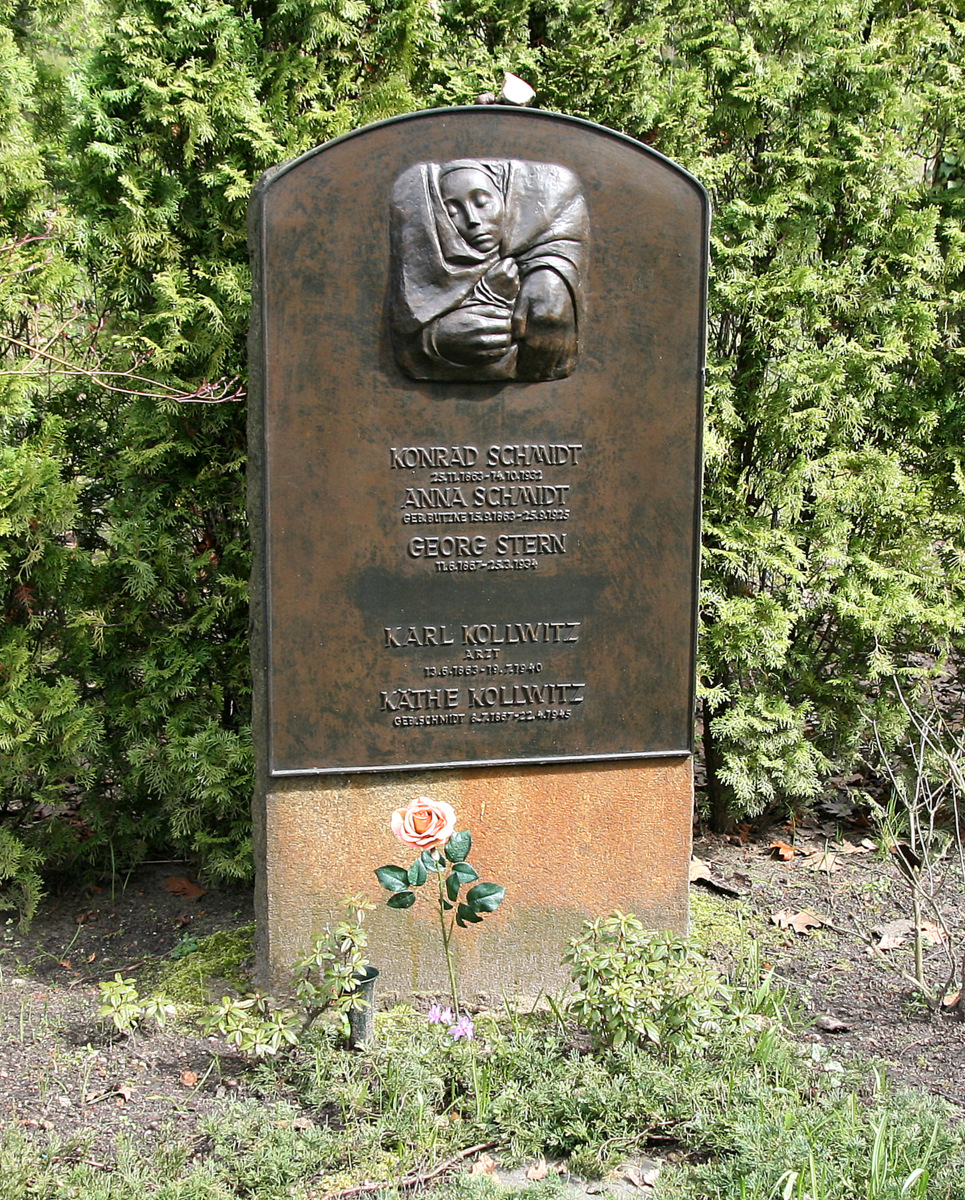
Kollwitz-Schmidt burial plot in Berlin

She was evacuated from Berlin in 1943. Later that year, her house was bombed and many drawings, prints, and documents were lost. She moved first to Nordhausen, then to Moritzburg, a town near Dresden, where she lived her final months as a guest of Prince Ernst Heinrich of Saxony. Kollwitz died just 16 days before the end of the war. She was cremated and honoured with an Ehrengrab in Berlin's Friedrichsfelde Cemetery.

== Legacy ==
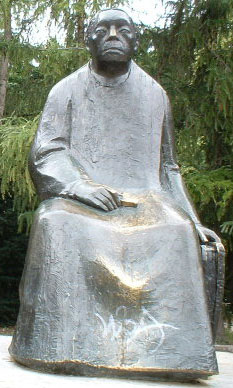
Statue by Gustav Seitz

Kollwitz made a total of 275 prints, in etching, woodcut and lithography. Virtually the only portraits she made during her life were images of herself, of which there are at least fifty. These self-portraits constitute a lifelong honest self-appraisal; "they are psychological milestones".

Her silent lines penetrate the marrow like a cry of pain; such a cry was never heard among the Greeks and Romans.

Dore Hoyer and what had been Mary Wigman's dance school created Dances for Käthe Kollwitz. The dance was performed in Dresden in 1946. Käthe Kollwitz is a subject within William T. Vollmann's Europe Central, a 2005 National Book Award winner for fiction. In the book, Vollmann describes the lives of those touched by the fighting and events surrounding World War II in Germany and the Soviet Union. Her chapter is entitled "Woman with Dead Child", after her sculpture of the same name.

Kollwitz's art was influential on the modern woodcut movement in China, as well as in etching and lithography. Lu Xun introduced her works into the China in 1931, when he published her woodcut Sacrifice in the journal The Big Dipper (Beidou). Kollwitz's work was appealing to Chinese artists for how it depicted the plight of the common people's suffering. Chinese artists influenced by Kollwitz's works include Li Hua and Wang Qi.

An enlarged version of a similar Kollwitz sculpture, Mother with her Dead Son, was placed in 1993 at the center of Neue Wache in Berlin, which serves as a monument to "the Victims of War and Tyranny".

More than 40 German schools are named after Kollwitz. A statue of Kollwitz by Gustav Seitz was installed in Kollwitzplatz, Berlin in 1960 where it remains to this day.

Four museums, in Berlin, Cologne and Moritzburg, and the Käthe Kollwitz Museum in Koekelare are dedicated solely to her work. The Käthe Kollwitz Prize, established in 1960, is named after her.

In 1986, a DEFA film Käthe Kollwitz, about the artist was made with Jutta Wachowiak as Kollwitz.

In 2012, an exhibition of her work was curated for the Weisman Art Museum at the University of Minnesota by the art historian Corinna Kirsch.

Kollwitz is one of the 14 main characters of the series 14 - Diaries of the Great War in 2014. She is played by actress Christina Große.

In 2014, the Dallas Museum of Art exhibited, Käthe Kollwitz: A Social Activist in the Era of World War I.

In 2017, Google Doodle marked Kollwitz's 150th birthday.

An exhibition, Portrait of the Artist: Käthe Kollwitz was held at the Ikon Gallery in Birmingham, England, from 13 September – 26 November 2017, and is intended to be shown subsequently in Salisbury, Swansea, Hull and London.

A retrospective exhibition of her work was held at the Museum of Modern Art in New York in 2024.

== Gallery ==
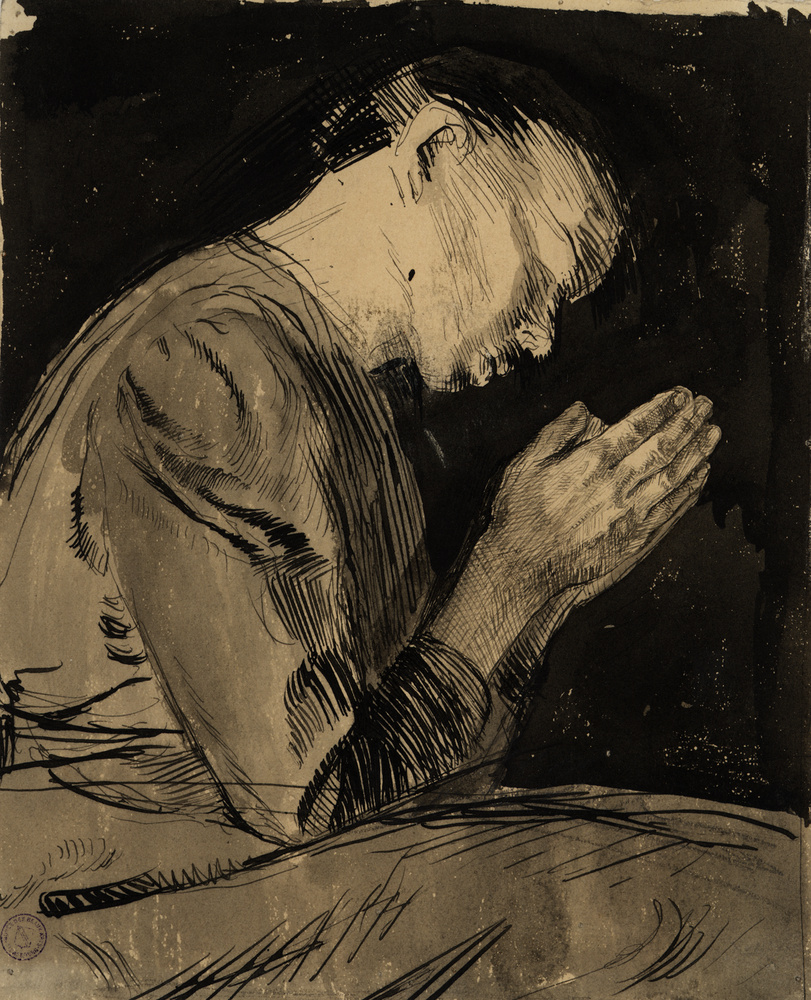
Praying woman, 1892. Musée d'art moderne et contemporain of Strasbourg

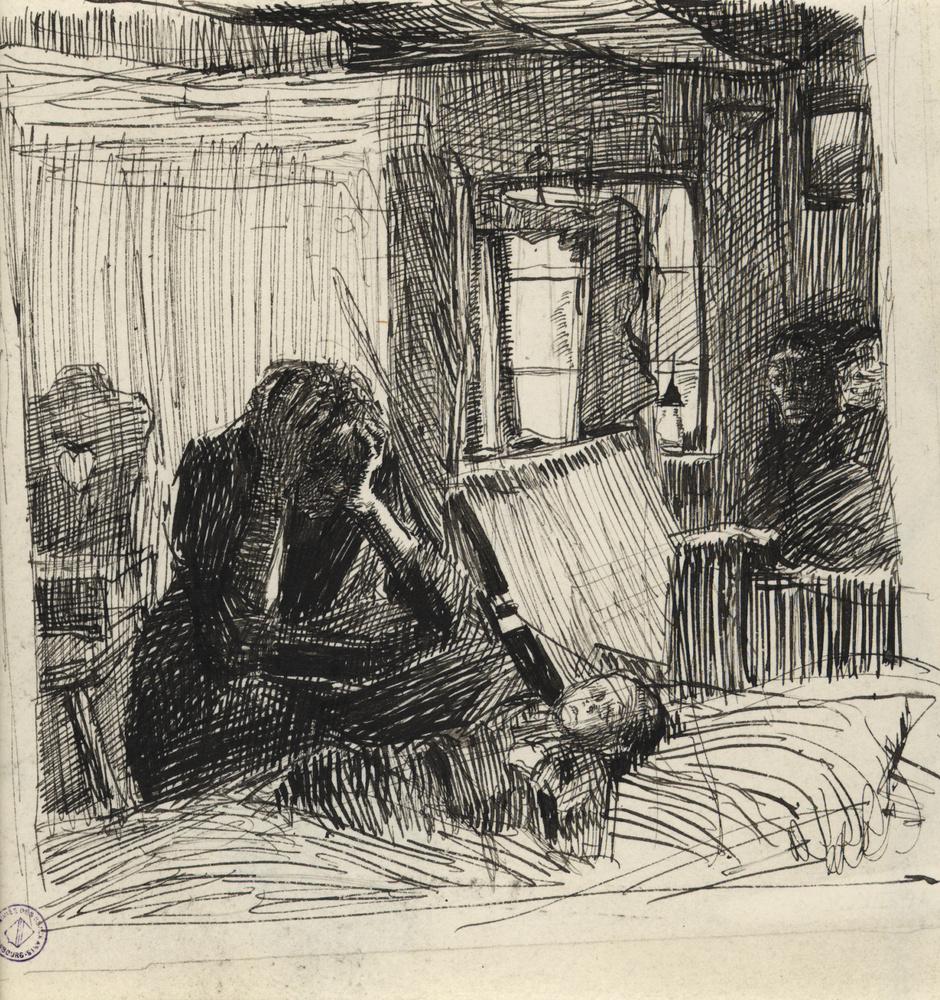
Misery, 1897. Musée d'art moderne et contemporain of Strasbourg

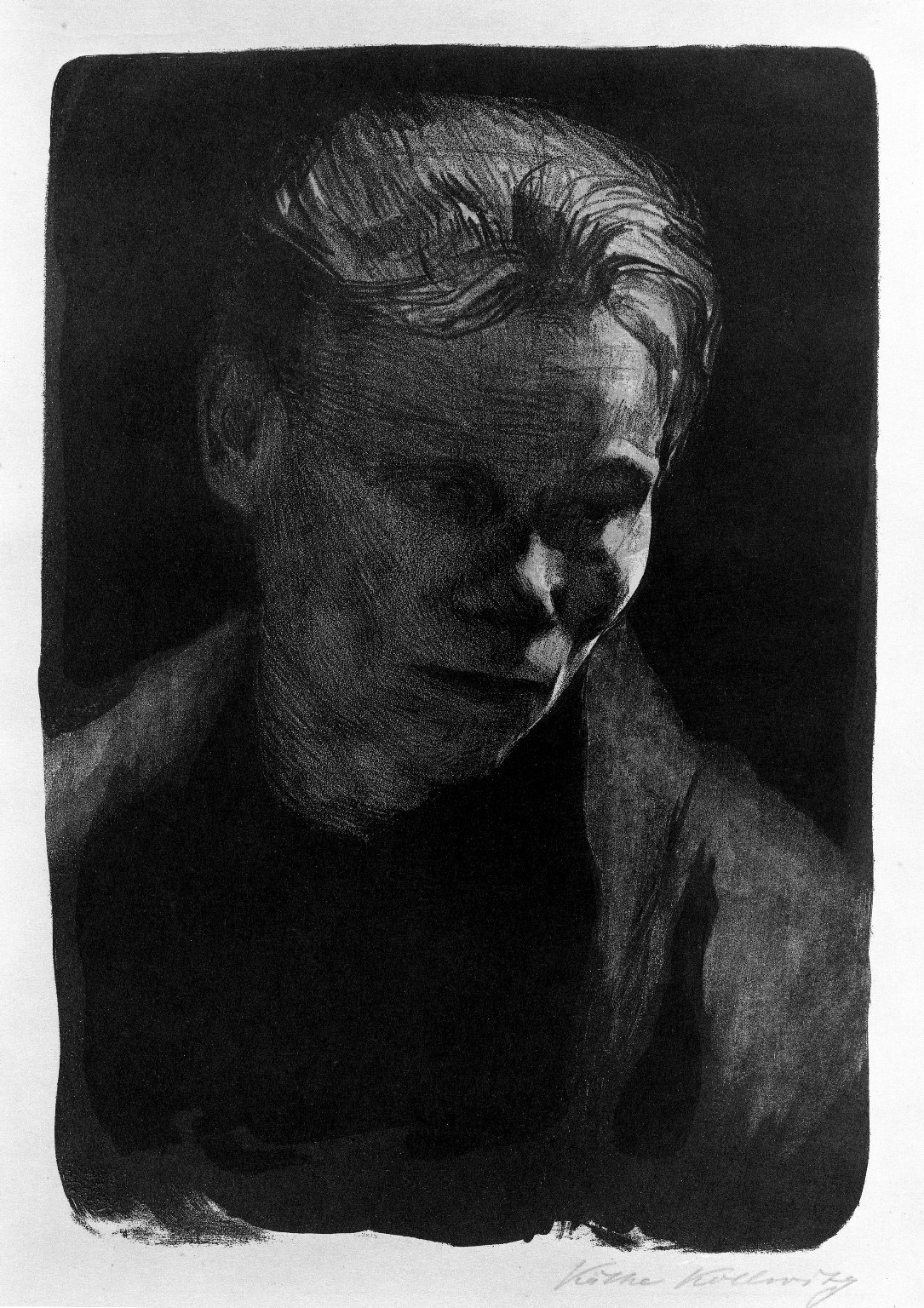
Bust of a Working Woman in a Blue Shawl, 1903. Brooklyn Museum

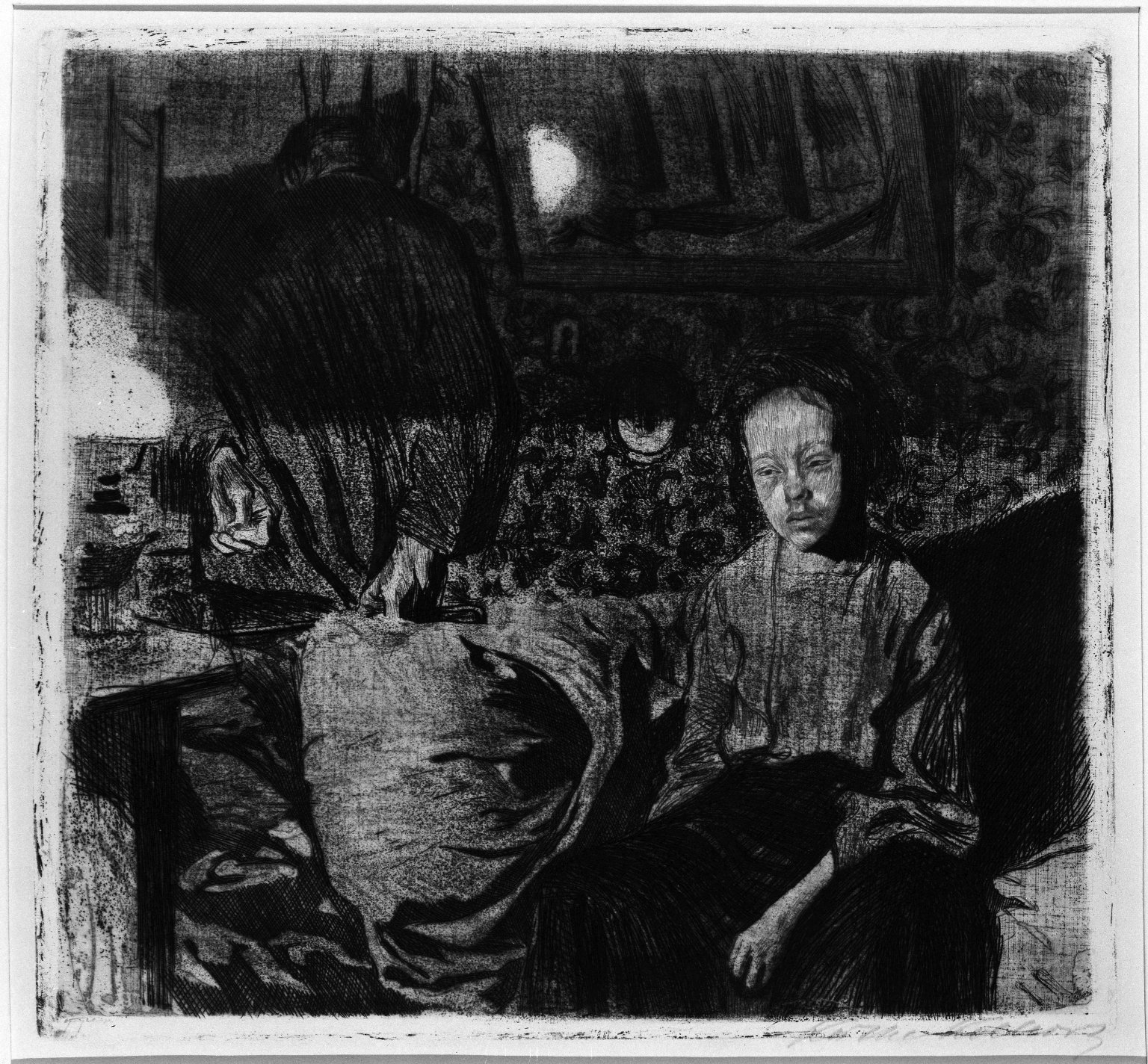
The Young Couple, 1904. Brooklyn Museum

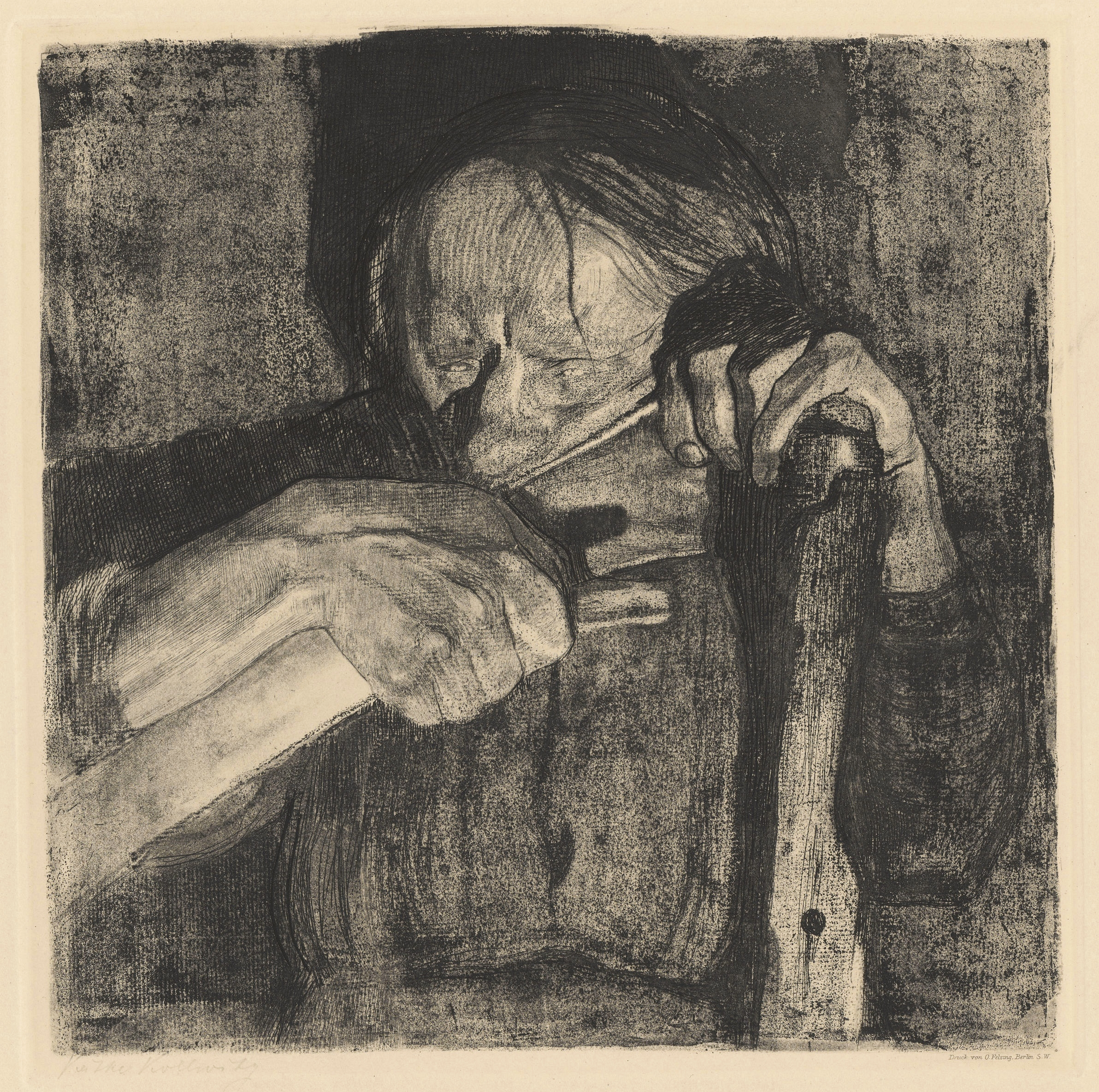
Whetting the Scythe, 1908, National Museum in Wrocław

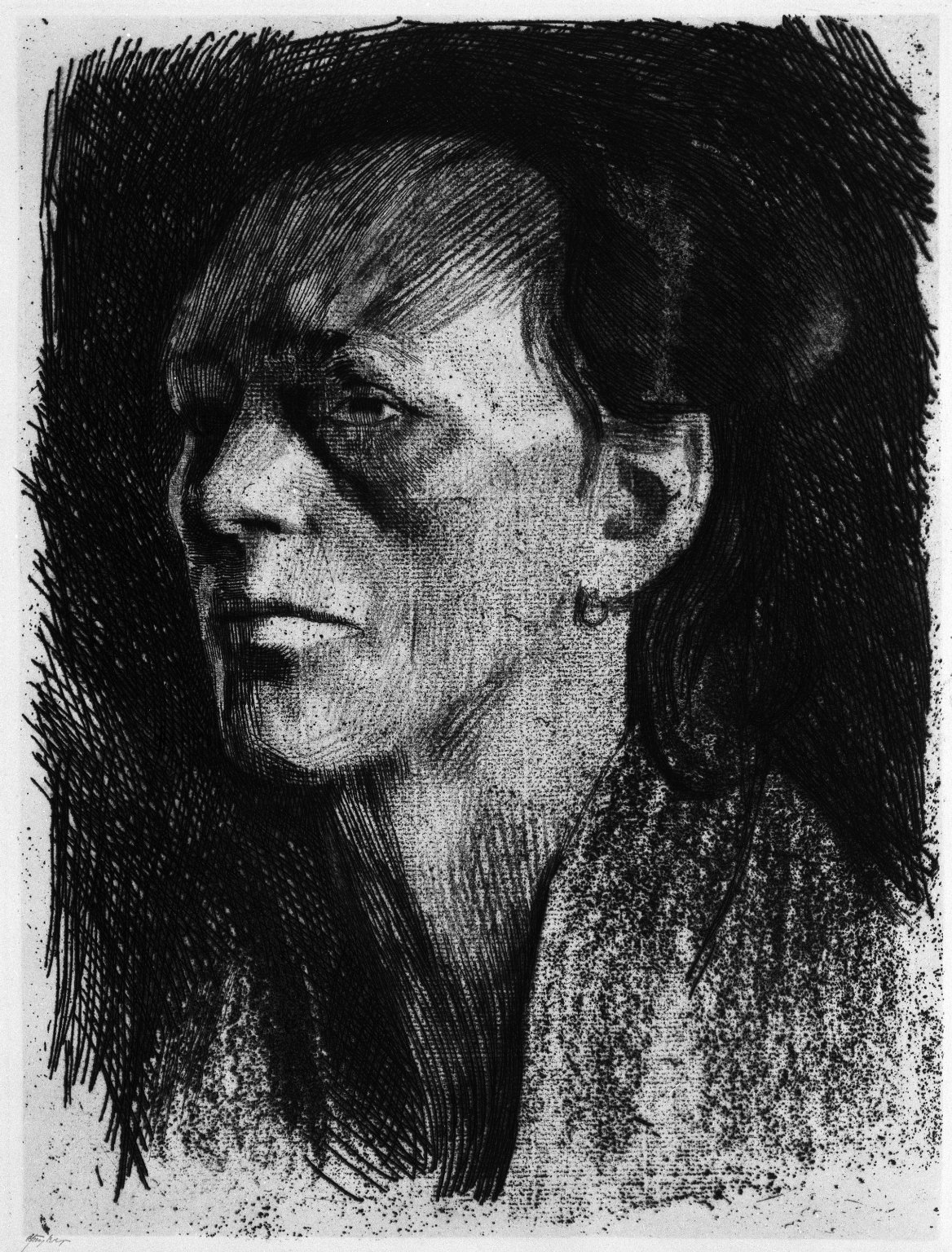
Working Woman (with Earring), 1910. Brooklyn Museum

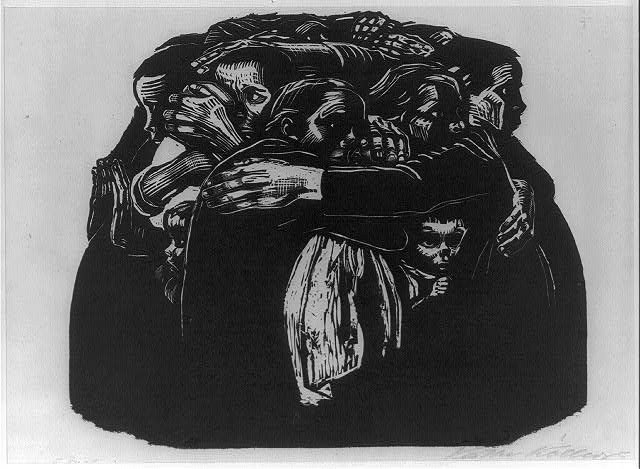
Die Mütter [The Mothers], 1922, woodcut, Library of Congress

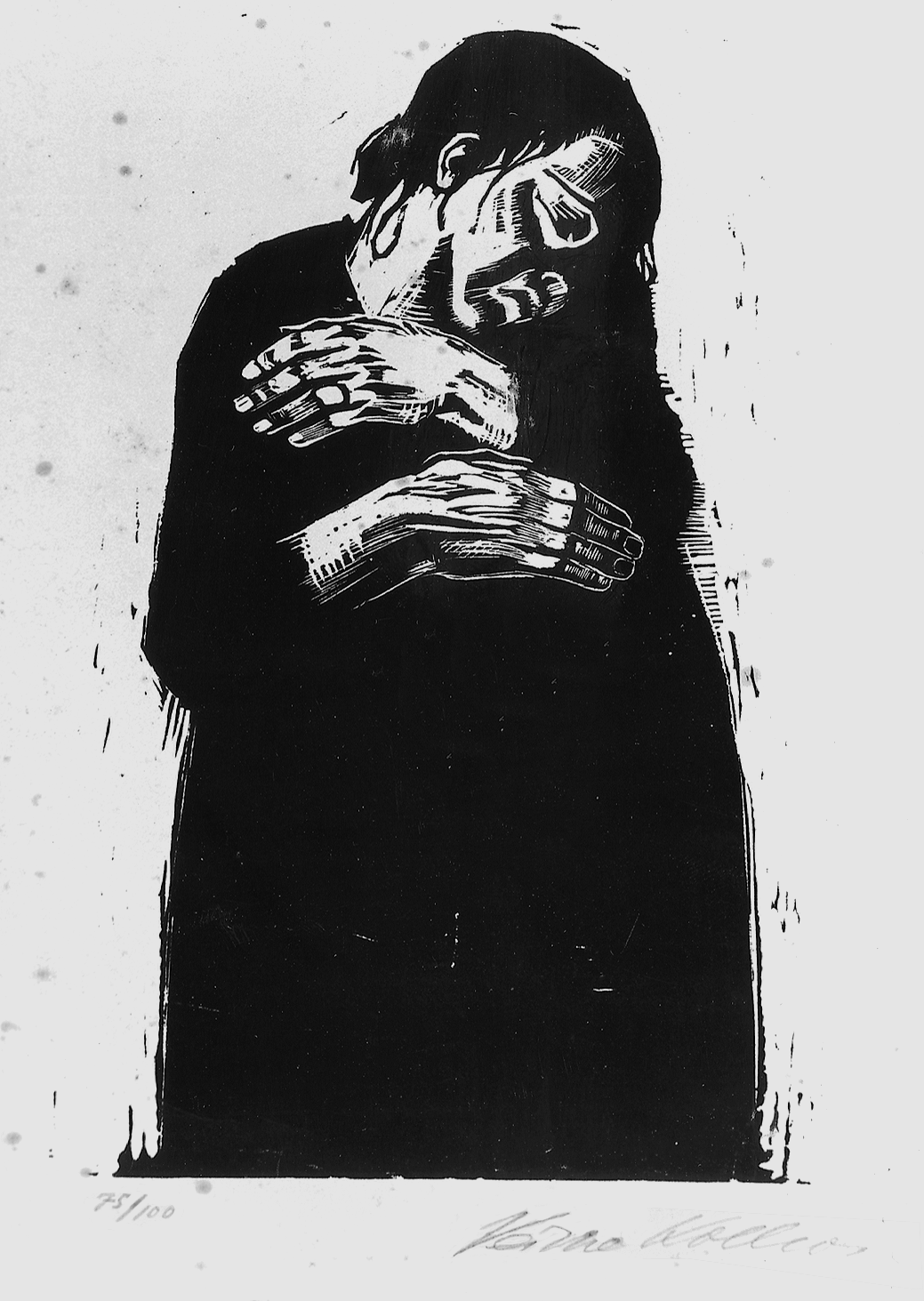
The Widow I (1922–23), woodcut from the Mario de Andrade Collection, at the Instituto de Estudos Brasileiros

== Literature ==
- Hannelore Fischer for the Käthe Kollwitz Museum Cologne (Ed.): Käthe Kollwitz. A Survey of her Works. 1888–1942, Hirmer publishers, Munich 2022, ISBN 978-3-7774-3079-9.
- Kearns, Martha (1976). Käthe Kollwitz: woman and artist. Old Westbury, N.Y: Feminist Press. ISBN 978-0-912670-15-7.

== See also ==
- List of German women artists
