= Käthe Kollwitz Museum (Cologne) =

Museum in Cologne, Germany

Coordinates: 50°56′11.94″N 6°56′48.19″E

Käthe Kollwitz Museum Köln
- Established: 22 April 1985
- Location: Neumarkt 18–24, Cologne, Germany
- Director: Hannelore Fischer
- Public transit access: 1 3 4 7 9 12 16 18 at Neumarkt
- Website: www.kollwitz.de

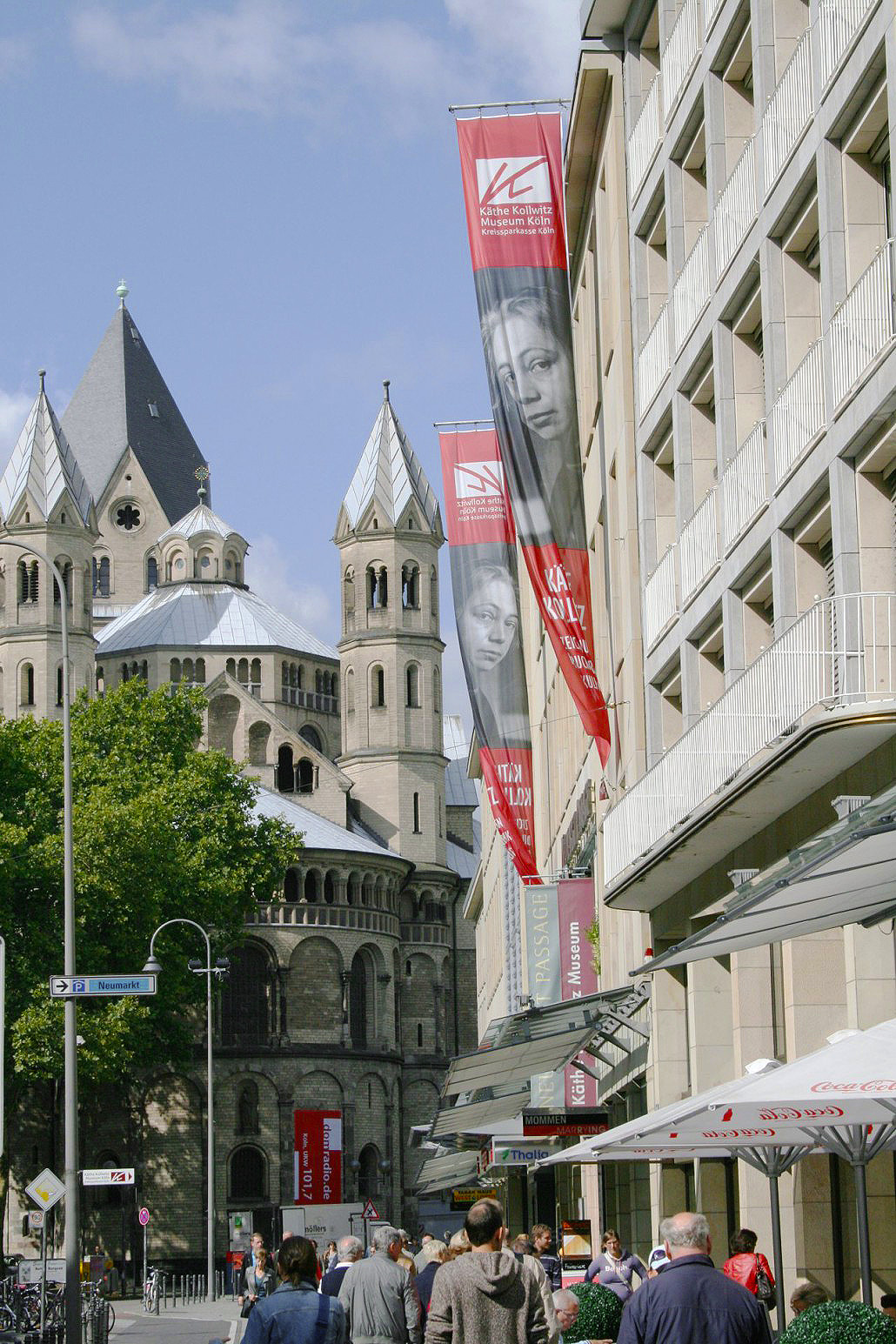
The Käthe Kollwitz Museum, Cologne.

The Käthe Kollwitz Museum in Cologne owns the largest collections of works by the German artist Käthe Kollwitz (1867–1945) and has maintained close links with the Kollwitz family. The museum is owned and operated by the Kreissparkasse Köln savings bank.

== History of the museum ==
The Käthe Kollwitz Museum Köln was founded in 1985 on the occasion of the first presentation of the Käthe Kollwitz Collection of the Kreissparkasse Köln on 22 April 1985, the 40th anniversary of the death of the artist. This presentation took place in the former boardroom of the bank. Since 1989 the museum with its exhibition area of 1,000 square metres has been housed on the top floor of a Cologne Neumarkt shopping arcade (Neumarkt Gallerie) which was designed by Hans Schilling.

The history of the collection began in 1976 when, in the context of a Kollwitz exhibition in the bank's foyer, the bank acquired two lithographs by the artist. Together with a set of 60 drawings, acquired from the Kollwitz family in 1983, these formed the foundation of the collection which is today the most comprehensive Kollwitz collection worldwide with roughly 300 drawings, more than 500 prints, all of Kollwitz’ posters, and all her sculptural works that can be shown as museum pieces.

The bank's commitment in its role as operator of the museum is motivated by the historical links between the work of Kollwitz and the roots of the German savings banks movement. The artist's themes – poverty, hunger, suffering – stand for those human hardships which the savings banks movement attempted to address in the 19th century. With the foundation of the museum, the Kreissparkasse Köln took the deliberate step of following the tradition of art patronage in Cologne. In accord with an agreement between the Kollwitz heirs and the bank, the collection is constantly amended, documented, made accessible for academic research and presented to the general public.

== Management ==
Dr Jutta Bohnke-Kollwitz, Käthe Kollwitz’ granddaughter, was the founding director of the Käthe Kollwitz Museum in Cologne. In January 1990, Hannelore Fischer MA took over as director of the museum.

== Collection ==
All the artist's great cycles of prints are in the possession of the museum – the early etching cycles based on literary models such as Ein Weberaufstand (The Weavers) (1893–1897) and Bauernkrieg (Peasant War) (1901–1908), the woodcut cycles Krieg (War) (1921/22) and Proletariat (1925), and the lithographic cycle Tod (Death) (1934–1937). In addition, the museum owns individual prints such as the large-scale colour lithograph Selbstbildnis en face (full face self-portrait) (1903/04), which was an experimental work without a print run, and her last lithograph Saatfrüchte sollen nicht vermahlt werden (Seed fruit is not to be ground down) (1941), the artist's legacy directed against the death of soldiers and war.

The central focus of the collection with regard to Kollwitz’ drawings is on the pen and ink drawings from her early work, charcoal drawings for the satirical magazine Simplicissimus, three of the ten colour pastels that are still extant, and her later work with a portfolio on the theme of Death. In addition, the collection includes pencil and charcoal drawings on the themes of Family, Politics and War, erotic scenes and nude studies from the so-called Secreta portfolio, self-portraits and portraits of workers . The collection also includes numerous preparatory sketches for the memorial Die trauernden Eltern (The Grieving Parents) (1918–1932) in the war cemetery at Vladso, and sketches for the print cycles Bauernkrieg (Peasant War) (1901–1908) and Krieg (War) (1921/22). The collection of the latter sketches focuses on the genesis of these two cycles.

The museum's collection of Kollwitz’ sculptural work is of particular importance and comprises all 15 bronze sculptures that can be shown as museum pieces. Almost all of these are rare examples of early casts. This sculptural collection, together with a copy of the Grieving Parents in the church ruin of Alt St. Alban (1956, created in the workshop of Ewald Mataré by his students Erwin Heerich and Joseph Beuys) and the Grabrelief Levy (funerary relief for Levy)(1938) at the Jewish cemetery in the Cologne district of Bocklemünd, gives visitors to Cologne the opportunity to study the entire sculptural work of the artist.

The museum also boasts a complete collection of Kollwitz’ posters against the war and for social justice, humanity and peace which she created mainly in the 1920s in line with her motto I am determined to have an impact in these times.

The collection also focuses on Käthe Kollwitz’ book illustrations almost all of which are represented at the museum.

== Research ==
The Cologne museum has a specialist library for academic research and documentation on the life and work of Käthe Kollwitz with publications on the artist and on artists who were active in her circle. In 2002 the bank gave financial support for the publication of the catalogue of prints in a revised edition by Alexandra von dem Kneesebeck. In 2010 the museum has published an extensive monograph with fundamentally new insights of the Kollwitz-research. Currently, the museum is working on the artist's catalogue of sculptural works in cooperation with Annette Seeler.

== Exhibitions ==
Alongside its permanent collection, the museum stages mainly monographic special exhibitions with works by artists whose work are historically or thematically related to Käthe Kollwitz. Other exhibitions focus on artistic techniques. Since 2006 the museum has also been staging photographic exhibitions in the context of photokina, the world's largest trade fair for the photographic and imaging industries in cologne.

== See also ==
- List of museums in Cologne
- Käthe Kollwitz Museum (Berlin)
- Käthe Kollwitz House (Moritzburg)
- List of single-artist museums
