= Käthe Kollwitz Museum (Berlin) =

Museum in Berlin, Germany

Coordinates: 52°30′06″N 13°19′37″E

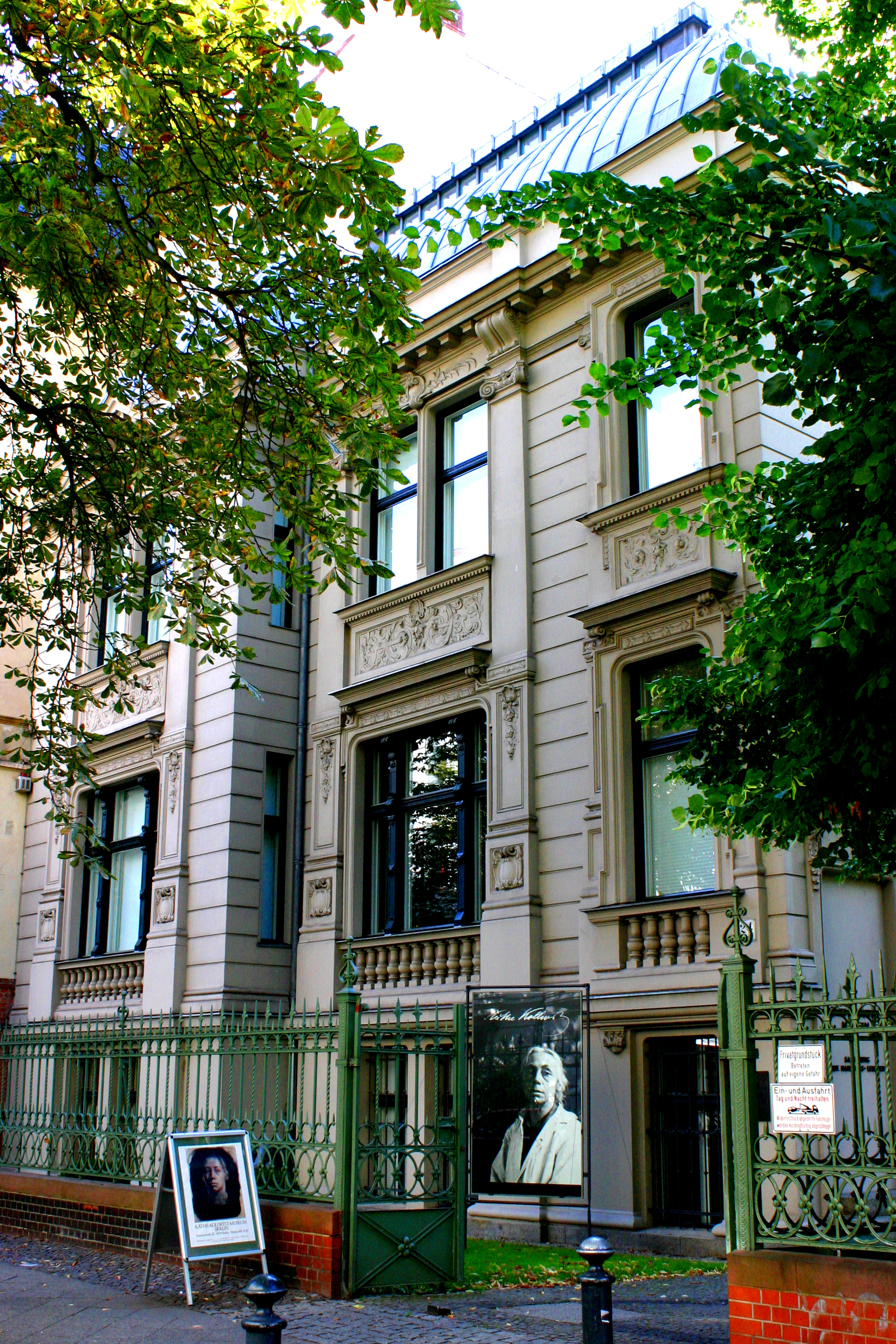
The former site of the Käthe Kollwitz Museum, Berlin.

Käthe Kollwitz Museum, Berlin

The Käthe Kollwitz Museum is a museum in Berlin that owns one of the largest collections of works by the German artist Käthe Kollwitz (1867–1945), who lived and worked in Berlin's Prenzlauer Berg for over 50 years.

The museum opened in 1986, and traces its origins to the art collector Hans Pels-Leusden (d.1993). Pels-Leusden had been collecting the artist's works since 1950, and created his first Kollwitz exhibition in 1965. He endowed 95 printed graphics, 40 drawings and 10 original posters to the museum.

The museum now owns over 200 works, including prints, drawings, posters, sculptures and woodcuts. Highlights include the lithograph Brot! (1924), the self-portraits, the woodcut cycle Krieg (1922/23), works on the theme of death, and a woodcut in remembrance of Karl Liebknecht (1919/1920). The upper floor contains a 2.1-metre-high sculpture of Kollwitz by Gustav Seitz.

There are special exhibitions roughly twice a year.

Before 2022 the museum was located on Fasanenstraße, in a villa from 1871 featuring late-classicist modifications from 1897. The building was partly destroyed during the Second World War, and not fully restored until the 1980s. This now forms part of the so-called Wintergartenensemble, together with the nearby Literaturhaus Berlin (including the Café Wintergarten) and the Villa Grisebach. In 2022 the museum was relocated to the so-called 'Theaterbau' beside the Charlottenburg Palace in Charlottenburg.

== See also ==
- List of single-artist museums
