= 1807 in architecture =

The year 1807 in architecture involved some significant events.

== Events ==
- John Smith is appointed official city architect of Aberdeen in Scotland.
- St Mark's Basilica in Venice is consecrated as a cathedral.

== Buildings and structures ==
=== Buildings ===
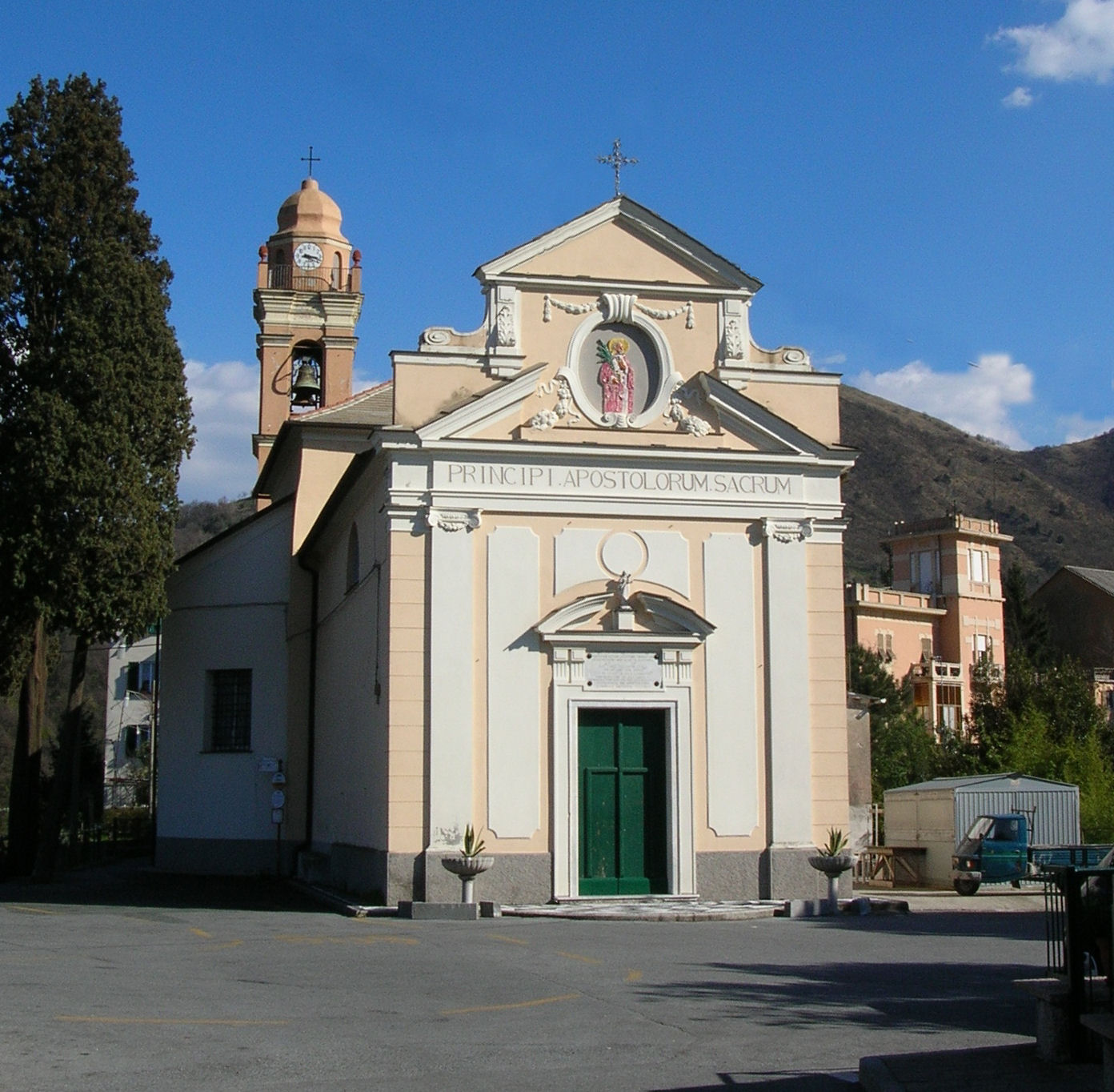
San Pietro di Cremeno, Genoa, Italy

- The church of San Pietro di Cremeno, Genoa, Italy, is built.
- The Templo de la Virgen del Carmen church in Celaya, Guanajuato, Mexico, designed by Francisco Eduardo Tresguerras, is completed.
- Saint Petersburg Manege (riding school), designed by Giacomo Quarenghi, is completed.
- "Old Academy" building for Perth Academy, Scotland, designed by Robert Reid, is completed.
- Chester City Club in England, designed by Thomas Harrison, is built as the Commercial Coffee Room.
- Huguang Guild Hall in Beijing, is built.
- Royal Crescent, Brighton, England (begun 1798) is completed.
- In Lincoln County, Maine, the Nichols-Sortwell House and Castle Tucker, examples of federal architecture, are built at Wiscasset's seaport on the Sheepscot River.

== Awards ==
- Grand Prix de Rome, architecture: Jean-Nicolas Huyot.

== Births ==
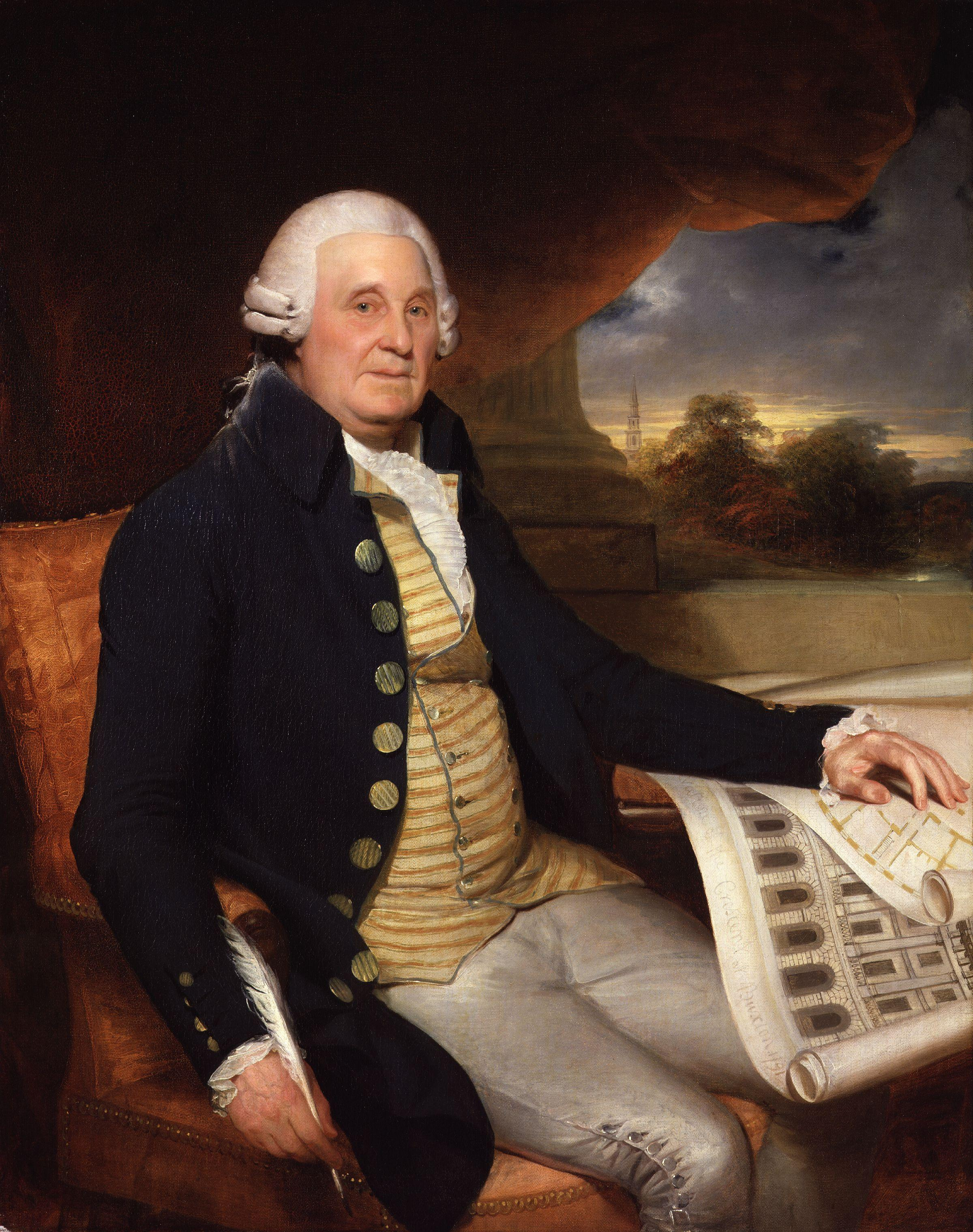
Portrait of John Carr by William Beechey

- April 28 – Alan Stevenson, Scottish lighthouse engineer (died 1865)
- September 26 – John Hayward, English architect (died 1891)

== Deaths ==
- February 22 – John Carr, English architect (born 1723)
