= 1796 in architecture =

The year 1796 in architecture involved some significant events.

== Events ==
- October 8 – The Sans Souci Theatre in Westminster, London, opens to the public, built by dramatist, musician and painter Charles Dibdin.

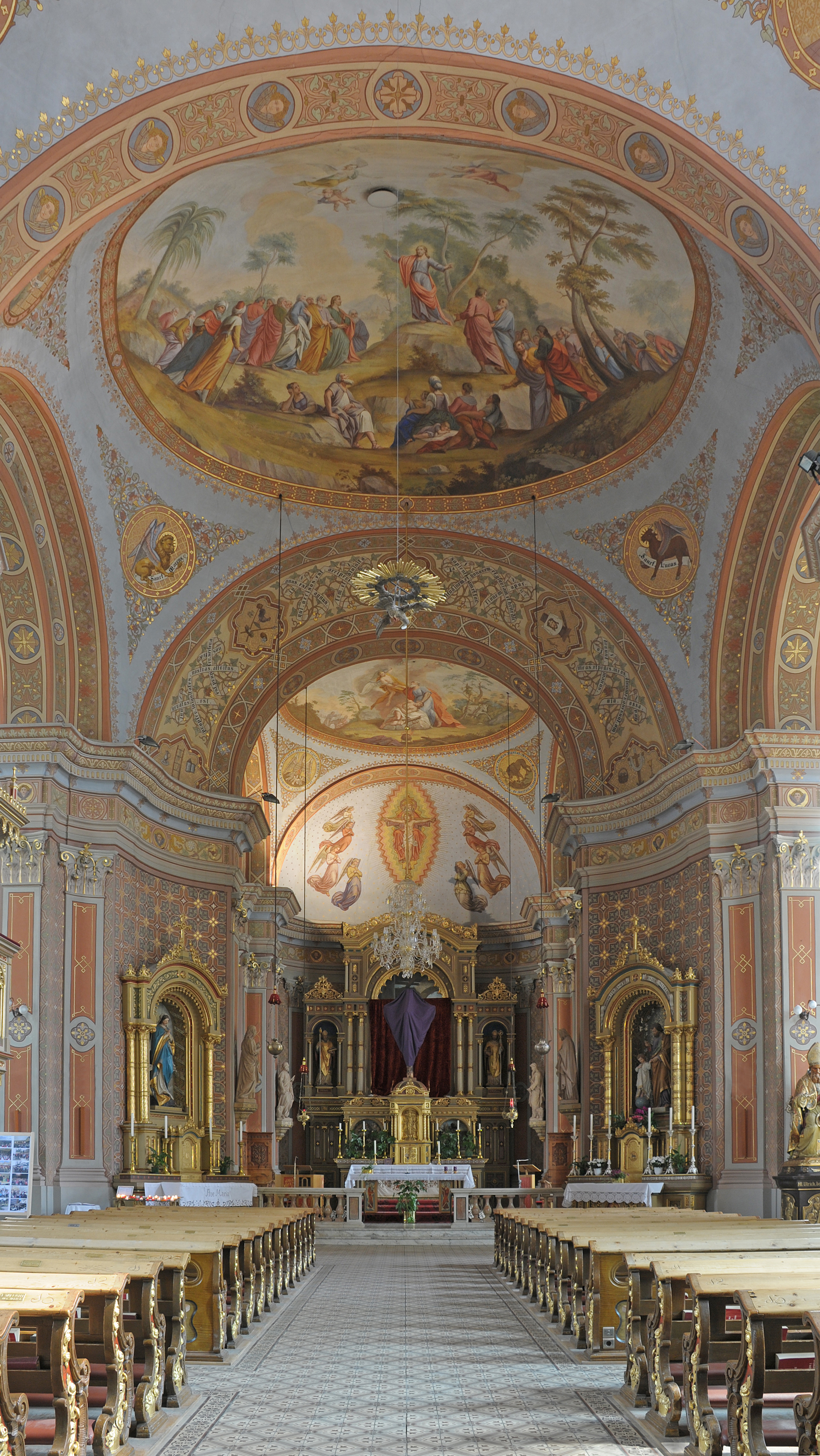
Parish church of Urtijëi

== Buildings and structures ==
=== Buildings ===
- Somerset House in London, designed by William Chambers is completed.
- The parish church of Urtijëi in the Italian Tyrol, designed by Joseph Abenthung, is completed.
- Hwaseong Fortress in Suwon, Korea, designed by Chŏng Yagyong, is completed.
- Work begins on Blaise Castle, commissioned by John Scandrett Harford from William Paty.
- Ffynone House near Boncath in Wales, designed by John Nash, is largely completed.
- The Mosque of Amr ibn al-As in Fustat, Egypt, is rebuilt by Mamluk leader Mourad Bey.

== Births ==
- date unknown – Mortimer Lewis, Colonial Architect of New South Wales (died 1879)

== Deaths ==
- January 11 – Jacob Otten Husly, Dutch neoclassical architect (born 1738)
- March 1 – Carl Fredrik Adelcrantz, Swedish architect and civil servant (born 1716)
- March 10 – William Chambers, English architect and Surveyor-General and Comptroller of the King's Works (born 1723)
