= 1723 in architecture =

The year 1723 in architecture involved some significant events.

== Buildings and structures ==
=== Buildings ===
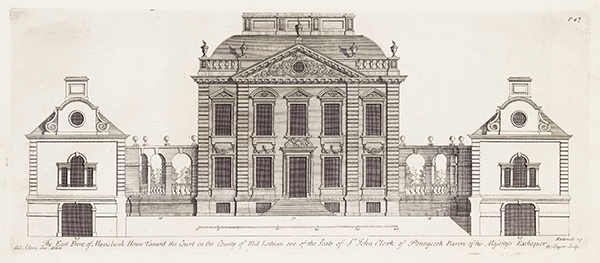
Mavisbank House, Scotland

- Mavisbank House in Midlothian is designed by William Adam in collaboration with his client, Sir John Clerk of Penicuik, and is constructed between 1723 and 1727, the first Palladian villa in Scotland.
- St Mary le Strand in London, designed by James Gibbs, becomes the first wholly new church completed for the Commission for Building Fifty New Churches.
- Sanctuary of the Madonna di San Luca, Bologna, Italy, is designed by Carlo Francesco Dotti.

== Awards ==
- Grand Prix de Rome, architecture: Jean Pinard.

== Births ==
- February 23 – William Chambers, Swedish-born Scottish architect (died 1796)
- April 28 – John Carr, English architect (died 1807)

== Deaths ==
- February 25 – Christopher Wren, English architect and scientist (born 1632)
- April 5 – Johann Bernhard Fischer von Erlach, Austrian baroque architect (born 1656)
