= Francisco Eduardo Tresguerras =

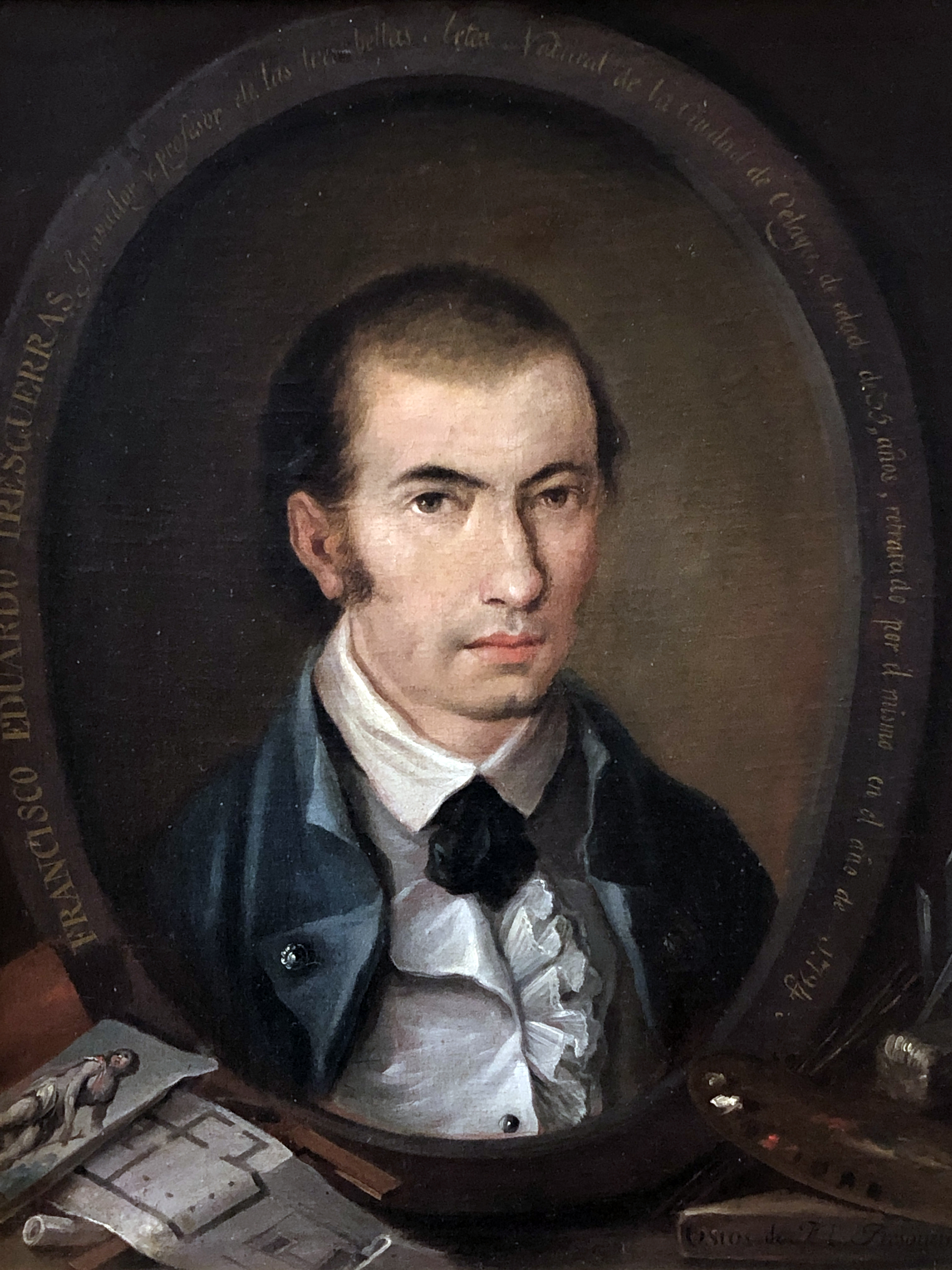
Francisco Eduardo Tresguerras, Mexican architect and painter

Francisco Eduardo Tresguerras (October 13, 1759 – August 3, 1833) was a Mexican architect and a painter. He was active during the colonial period and early independence.

== Biography ==
He was born in Celaya, Guanajuato. Believing he had a religious vocation, he entered a monastery in Mexico City, but soon changed his mind and returned to Celaya and was married. He began working as an artist — painting, sculpture and engraving. He soon requested permission to work as an architect. His first architectural works were the Fountain of Neptune (1797) and an arch commemorating the proclamation of Charles IV as king. Both of these are in Querétaro.

From 1802 through 1807 he worked rebuilding the church of El Carmen in Celaya, in a Neoclassical style. This is considered his greatest work. The church presents three Neoclassical façades, above which rises a tower ending in a bell shape. This was a novelty in New Spain at the time of its construction. The church also includes a graceful tiled dome above the crossing and a lateral façade showing French influence. Tresguerras also executed some of the sculptures in this church.

In the same city he designed the chapel for his interment in the church of San Francisco, and a bridge over the River La Laja. In Guanajuato City the palace of the Count of Casa Rul is his. Professionally, he traveled widely in the central part of the country. He is also credited with other buildings in San Luis Potosí, San Miguel el Grande, Salvatierra, Salamanca, Irapuato, and some towns in Jalisco.

Among his paintings are a portrait of his wife (1787), a self-portrait (1794) and two frescos in the church of El Carmen in San Luis Potosí. There is also a El Juicio Final (Last Judgment) in the chapel of Los Cofrades in the church of El Carmen de Celaya.

Tresguerras also wrote devotional works and poetic satires. A notebook of critical notes was published, unedited, in 1962 under the title Ocios literarios. His friends wrote a biographical sketch entitled Tres zamoranos ilustres. This remained unpublished until 1951, when it appeared in Morelia.

Tresguerras was arrested in 1811 for sympathy with the independence movement.

He died in 1833 in Celaya. The Museo Nacional de Artes Plásticas in Mexico City contains several of his works:

- La Virgen del Carmen
- Santa Rosa de Viterbo
- Educación de la Virgen

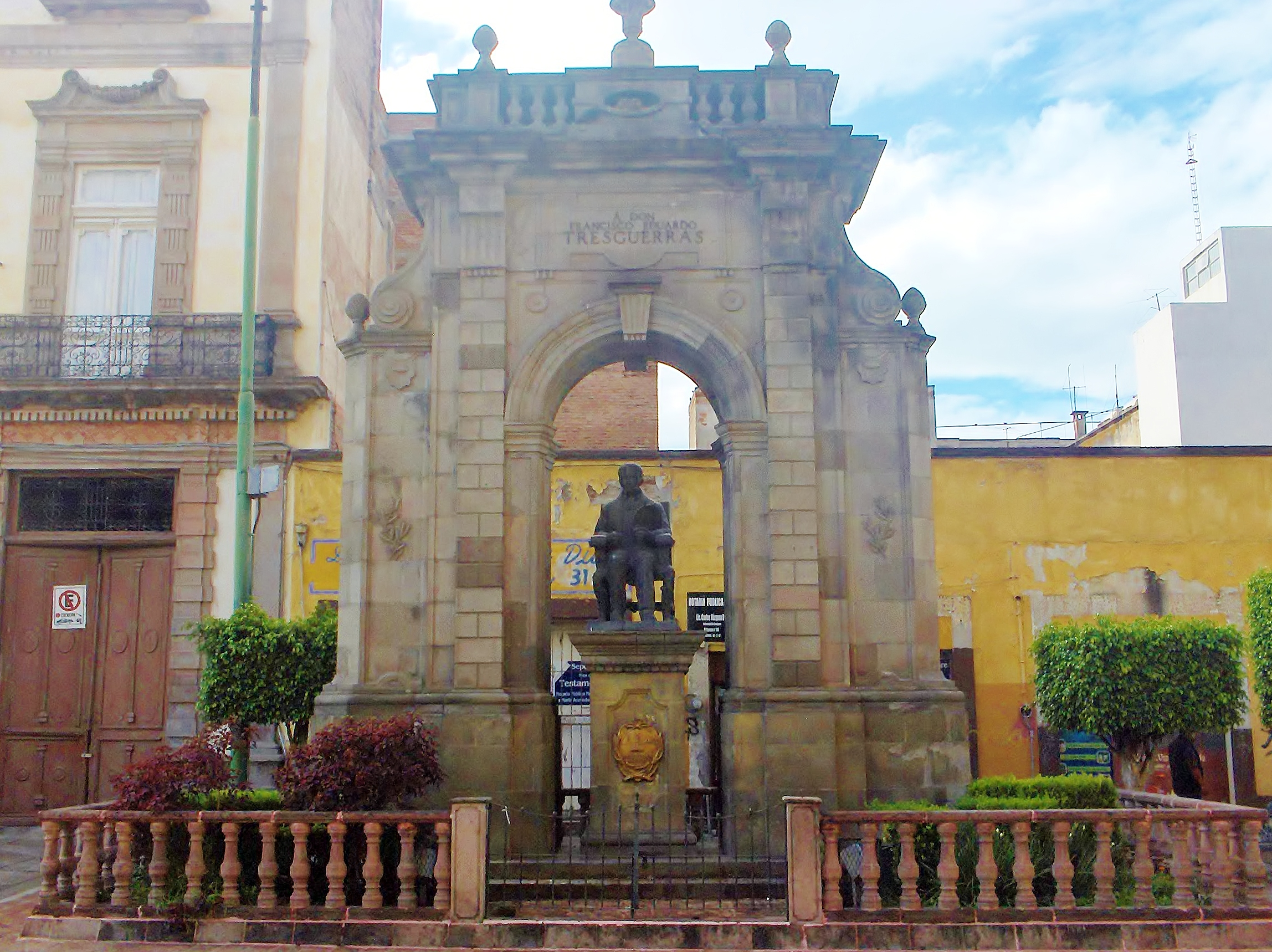
Statue dedicated to the celayense architect, Francisco Eduardo Tresguerras. Statue built over the street seeing the side of one of his opus, the Temple of the Our Lady of Mount Carmel, better known in Mexico as “La Virgen del Carmen”.
