= Parish church of Urtijëi =

Church in Urtijëi, Val Gardena, South Tyrol, Italy

Coordinates: 46.5752°N 11.6716°E

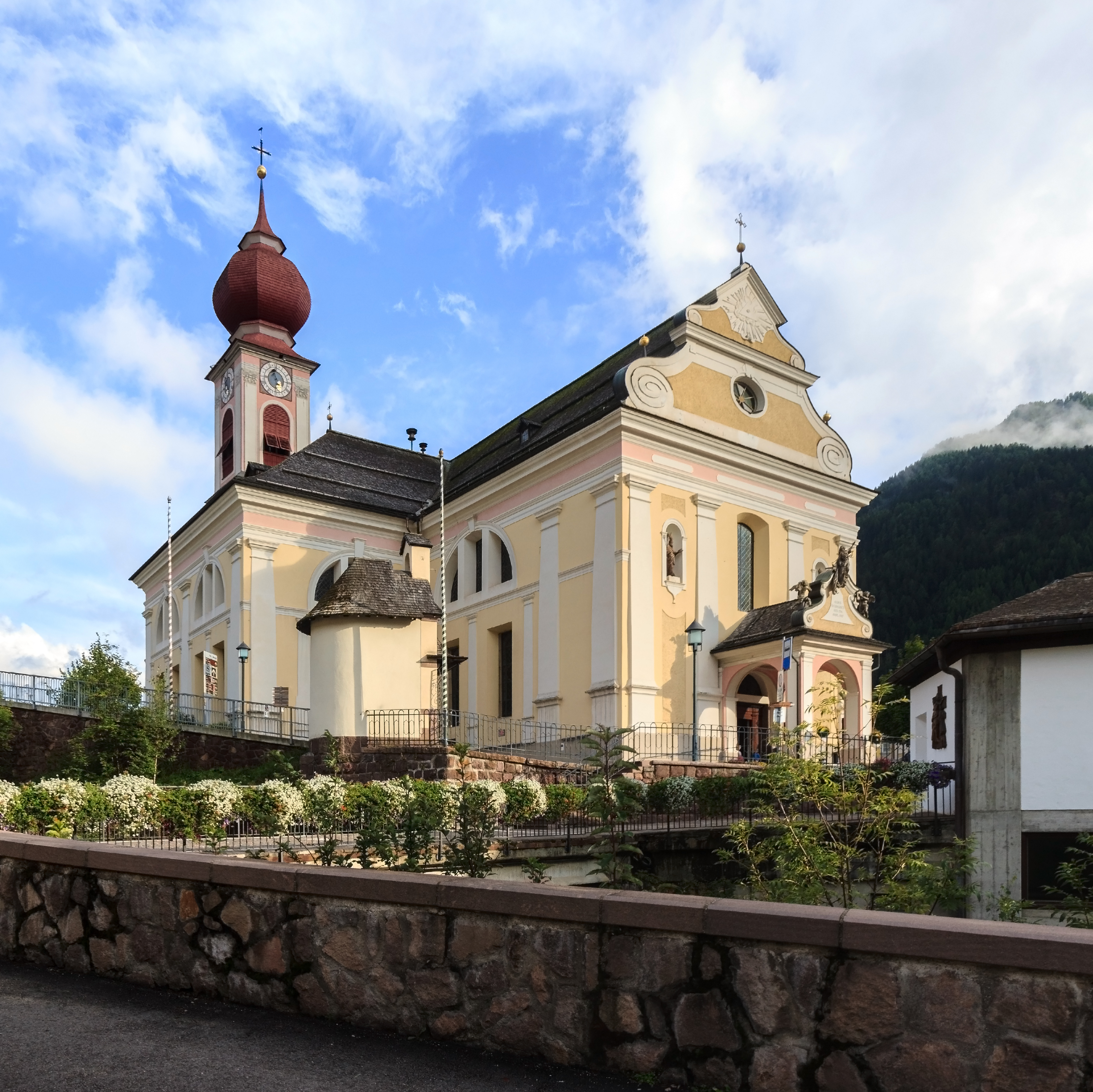

Religion
- Affiliation: Roman Catholic

Location
- Location: South Tyrol, Italy
- Interactive map of Parish church of Urtijëi

Architecture
- Completed: 1792-1796

The Parish Church of Urtijëi located in the town of Urtijëi in Val Gardena in South Tyrol, Italy is dedicated to the Epiphany and to Saint Ulrich.

It was built in the years 1792–1796 in the Neoclassical style with some Baroque elements by the tyrolean master Joseph Abenthung and the interior domes painted by the Tyrolean brothers Franz Xaver and Josef Kirchebner. The structure of the church has the form of Latin cross with a central nave and two lateral chapels dedicated to the Sacred Heart of Jesus and to Our Lady of the Rosary.

== Artworks ==
The church contains a great number of sculptures, mostly in wood, carved by artists from Val Gardena, including Vigil Dorigo, Luis Kostner, Josef Moroder-Lusenberg, Anton Pitscheider and Franz Ruggaldier. In the corners of the presbytery there are four plaster statues, created by Johann Dominik Mahlknecht (German Wikipedia) for this church but never cast in bronze, representing the four Evangelists.

The stained glass windows are a matching set, each one containing a roundel with the head of one of the Twelve Apostles.

Artists represented in the church include (all links leading to German Wikipedia):

- Ferdinand Demetz
- Jakob Crepaz
- Franz Xaver Kirchebner
- Johann Dominik Mahlknecht
- Josef Mersa
- Ludwig Moroder
- Rudolf Moroder
- Johann Baptist Moroder

== Gallery ==
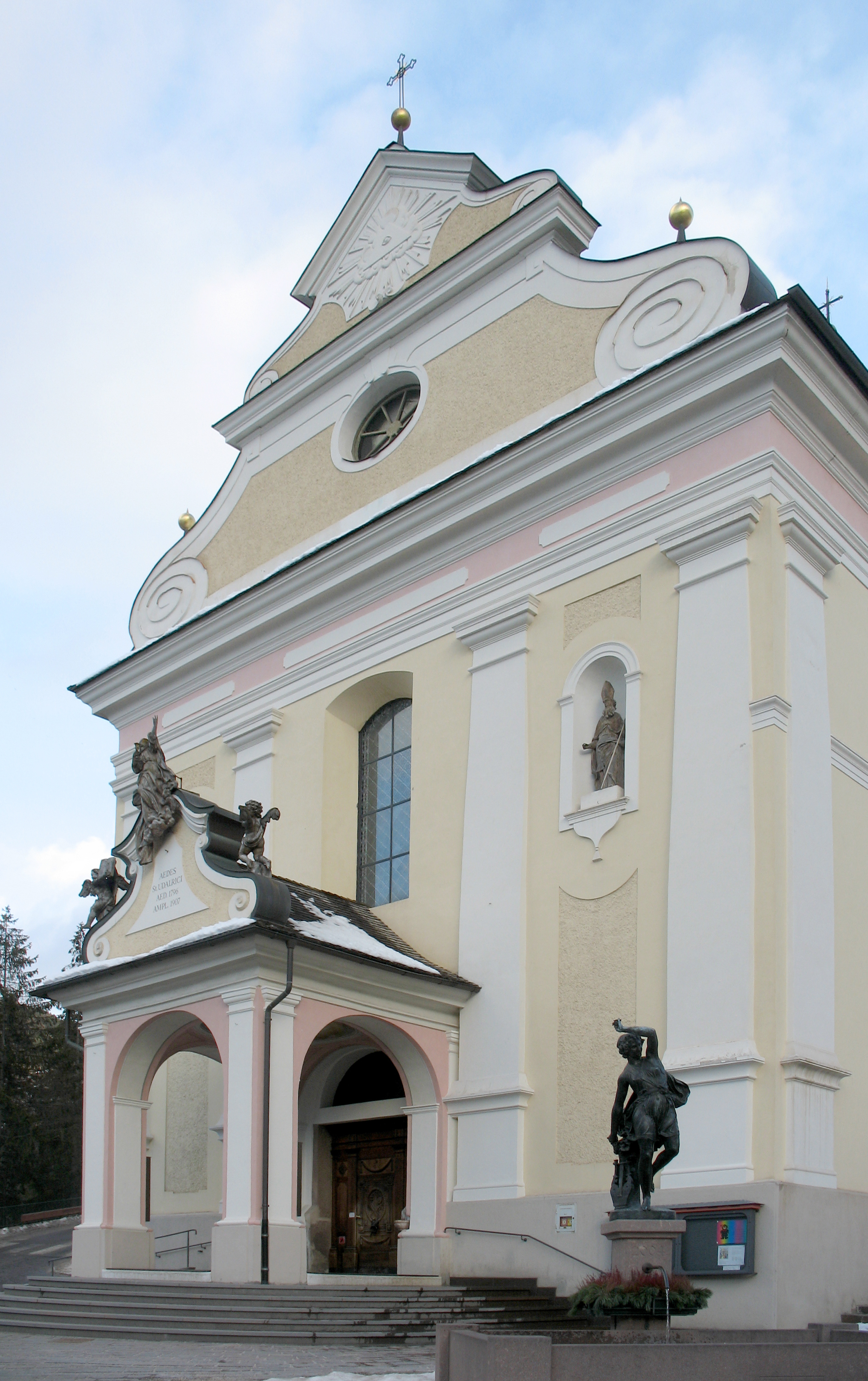
Facade of the church

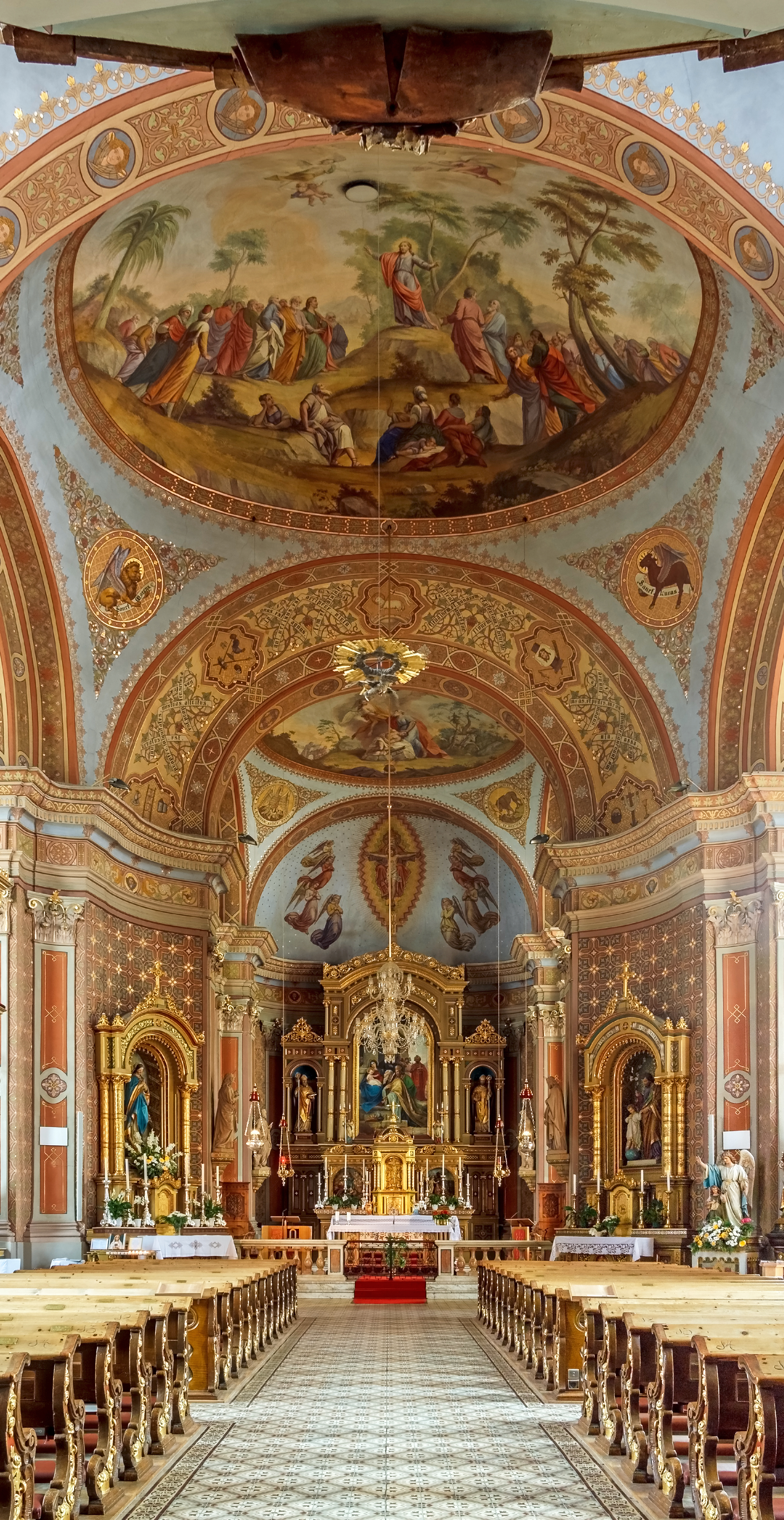
Nave

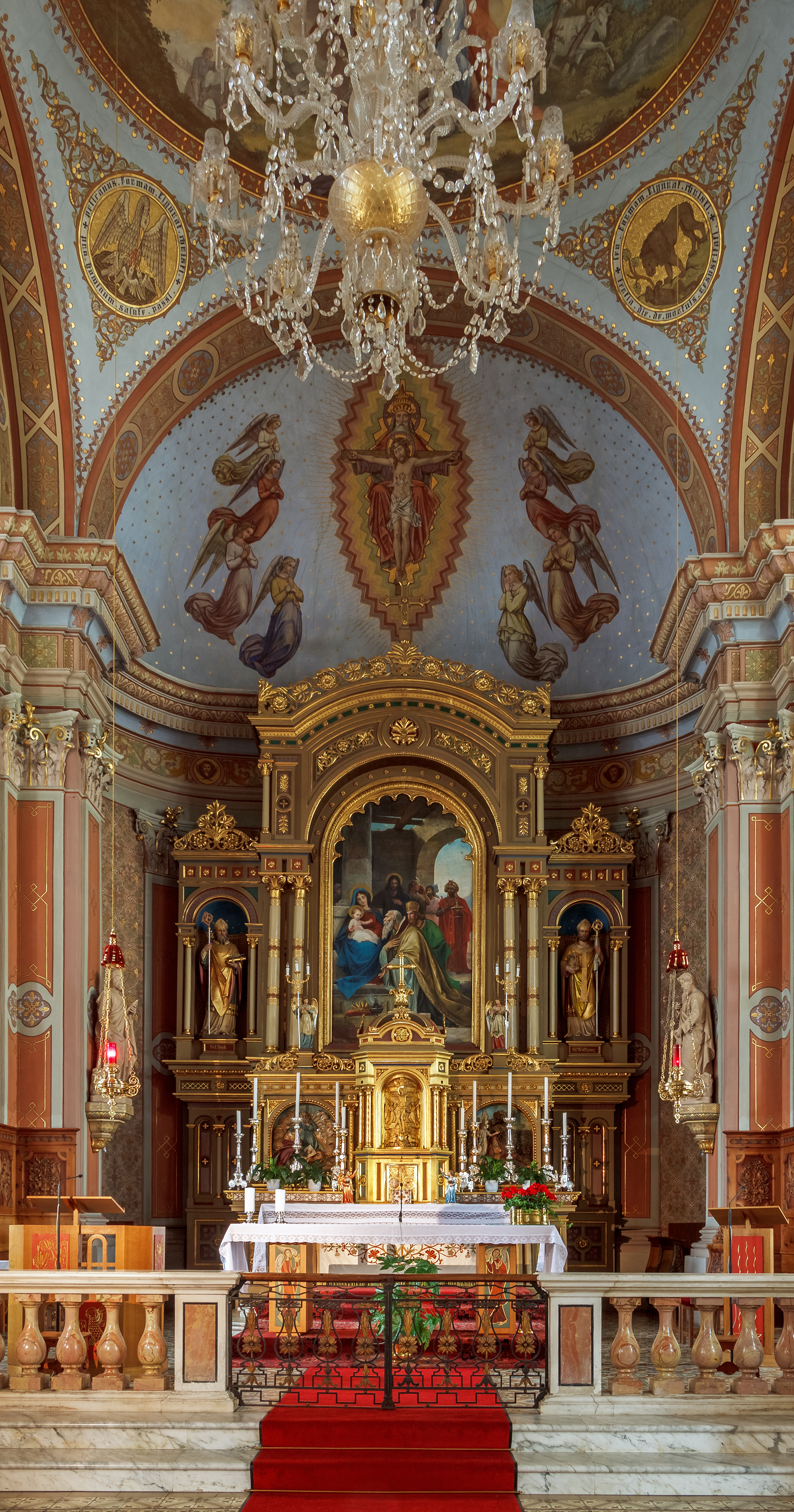
High altar

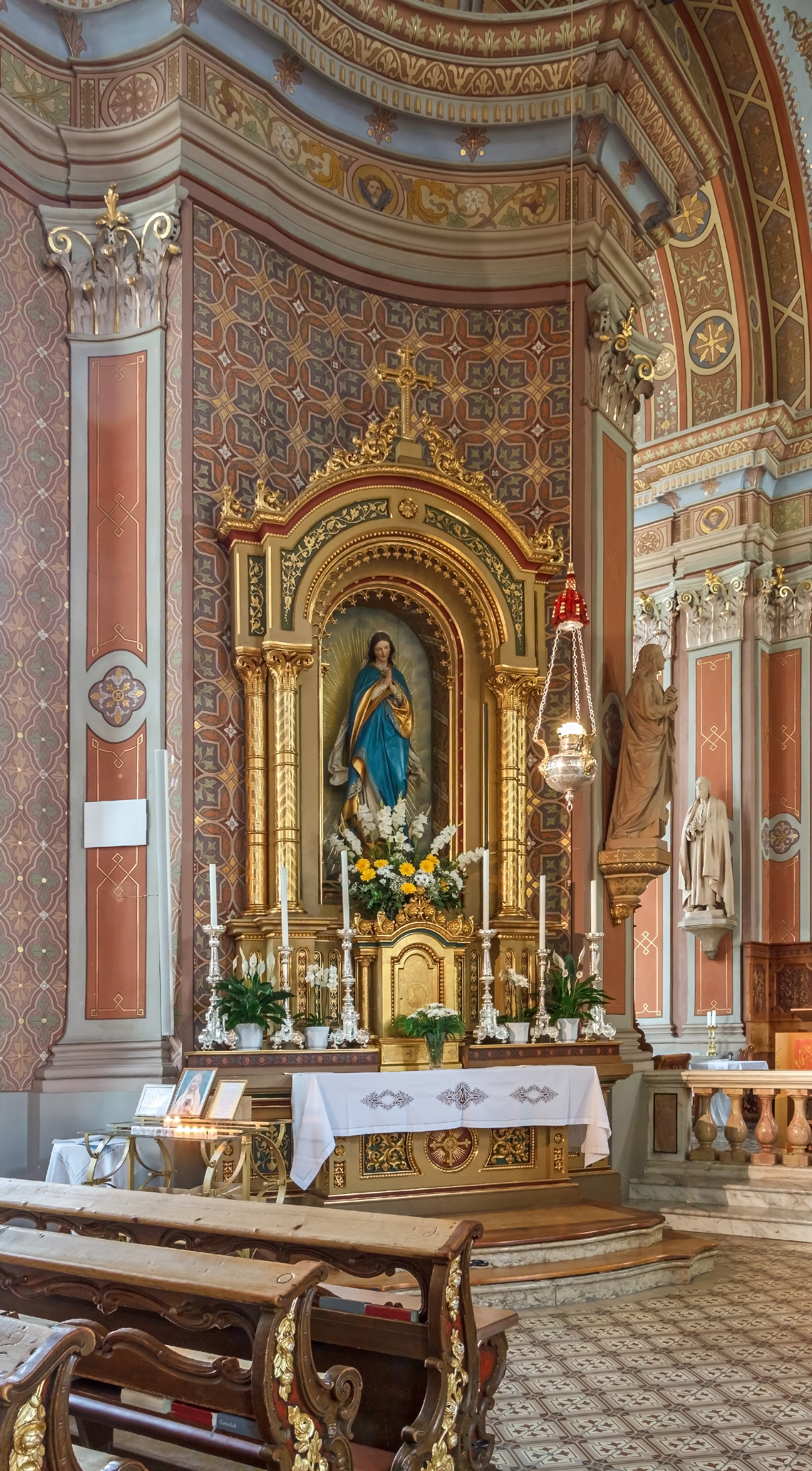
Left side altar

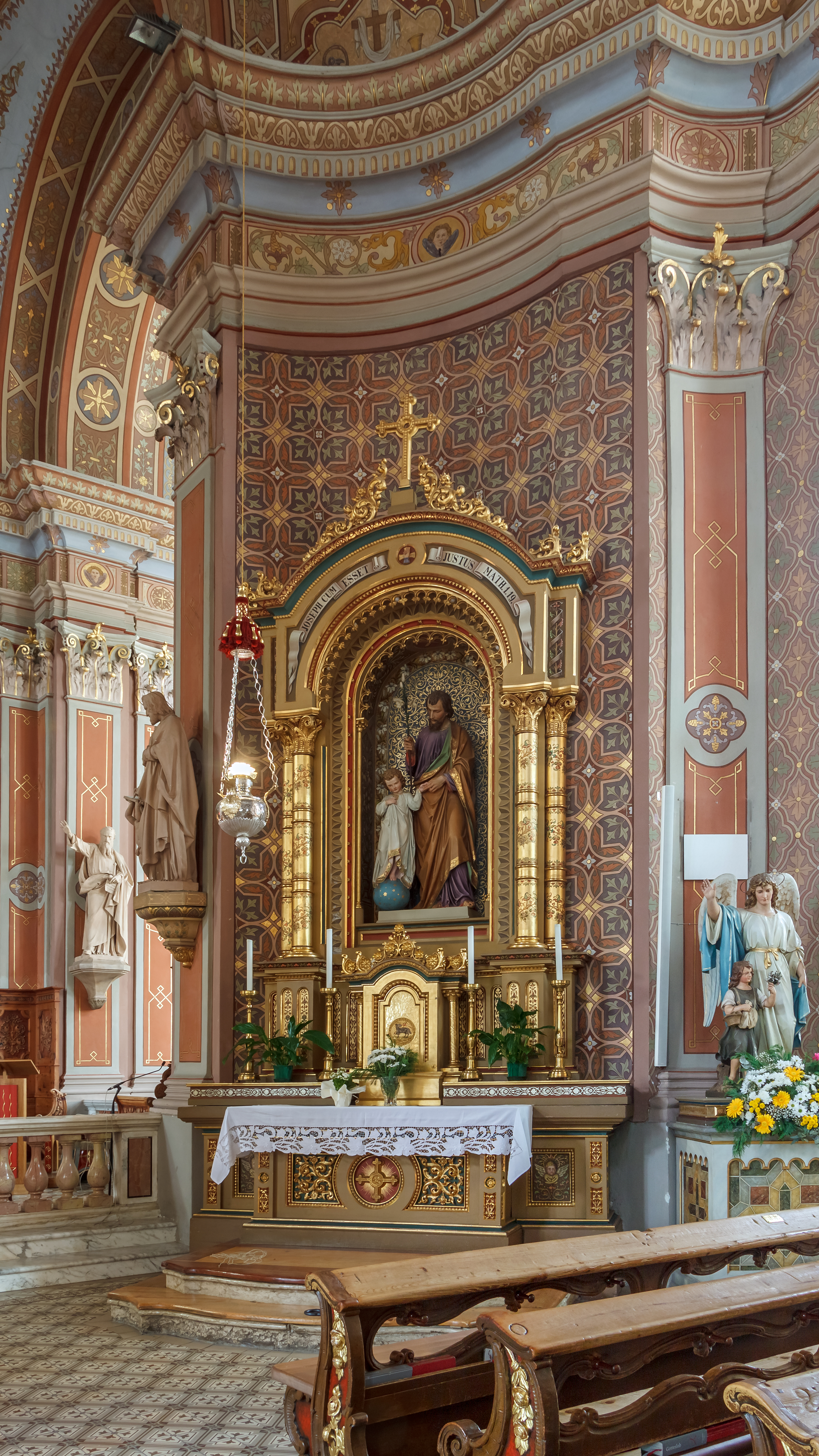
Right side altar

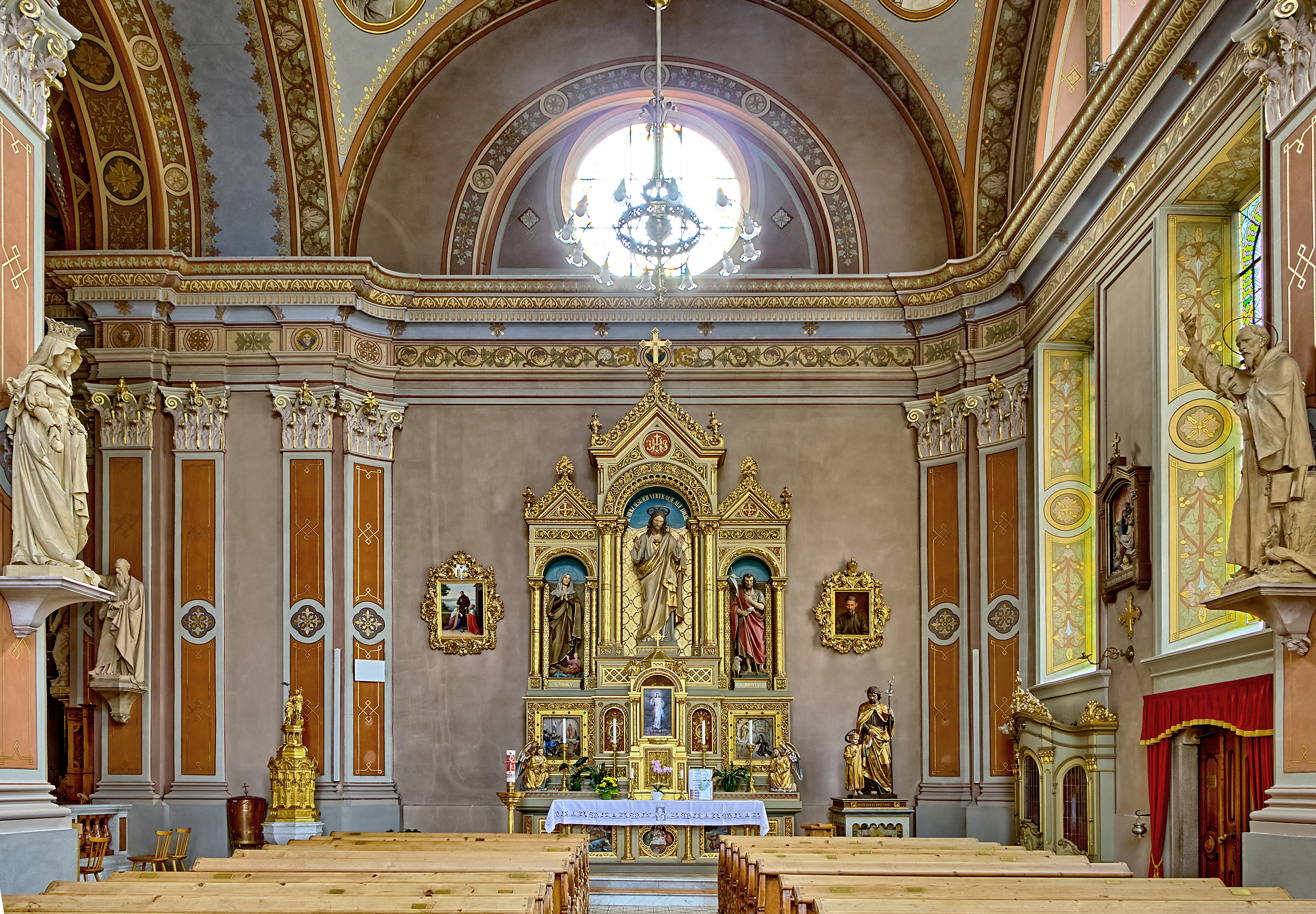
The chapel dedicated to the Sacred Heart of Jesus

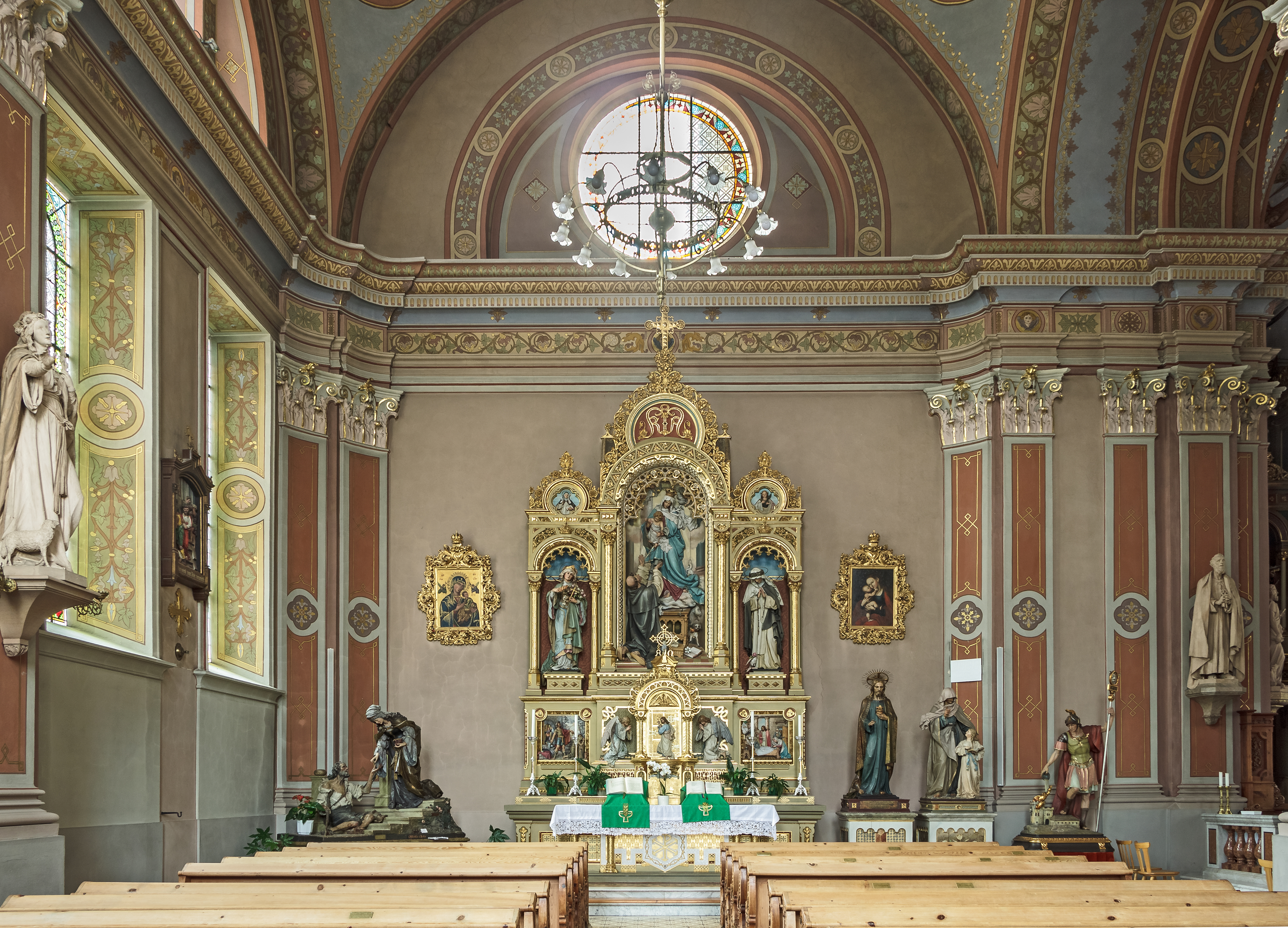
The Our Lady of the Rosary Chapel

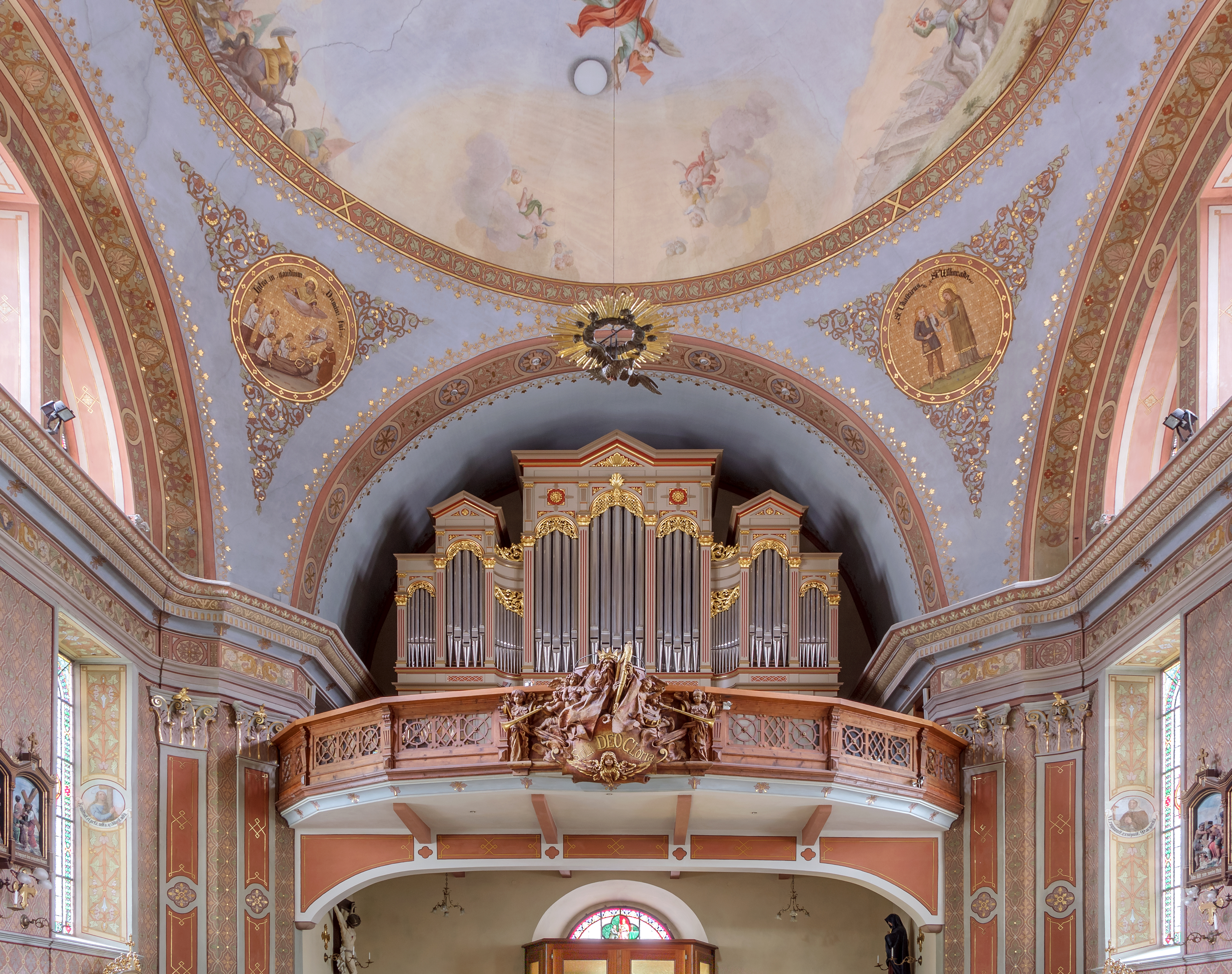
Organ loft

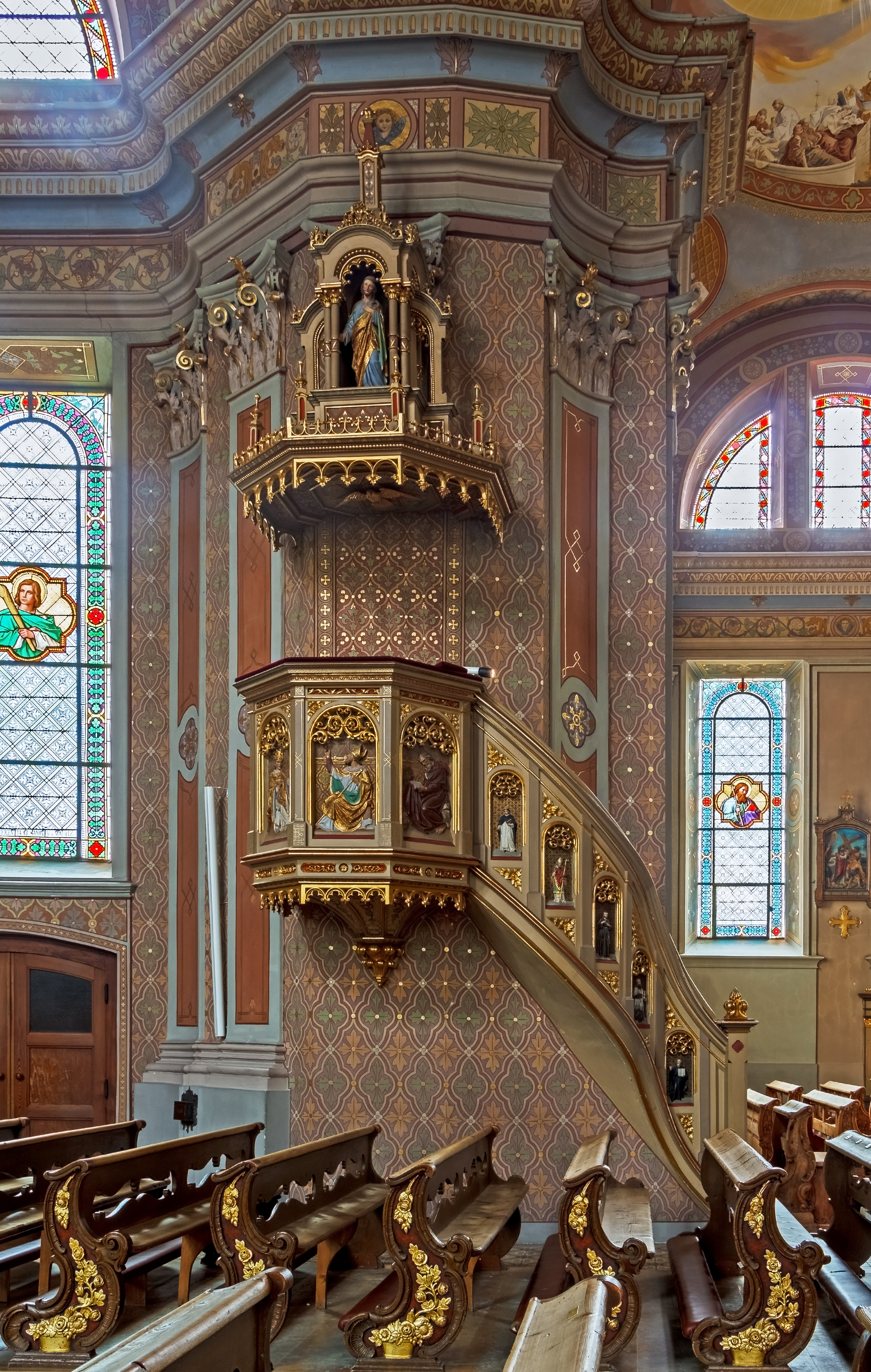
Pulpit

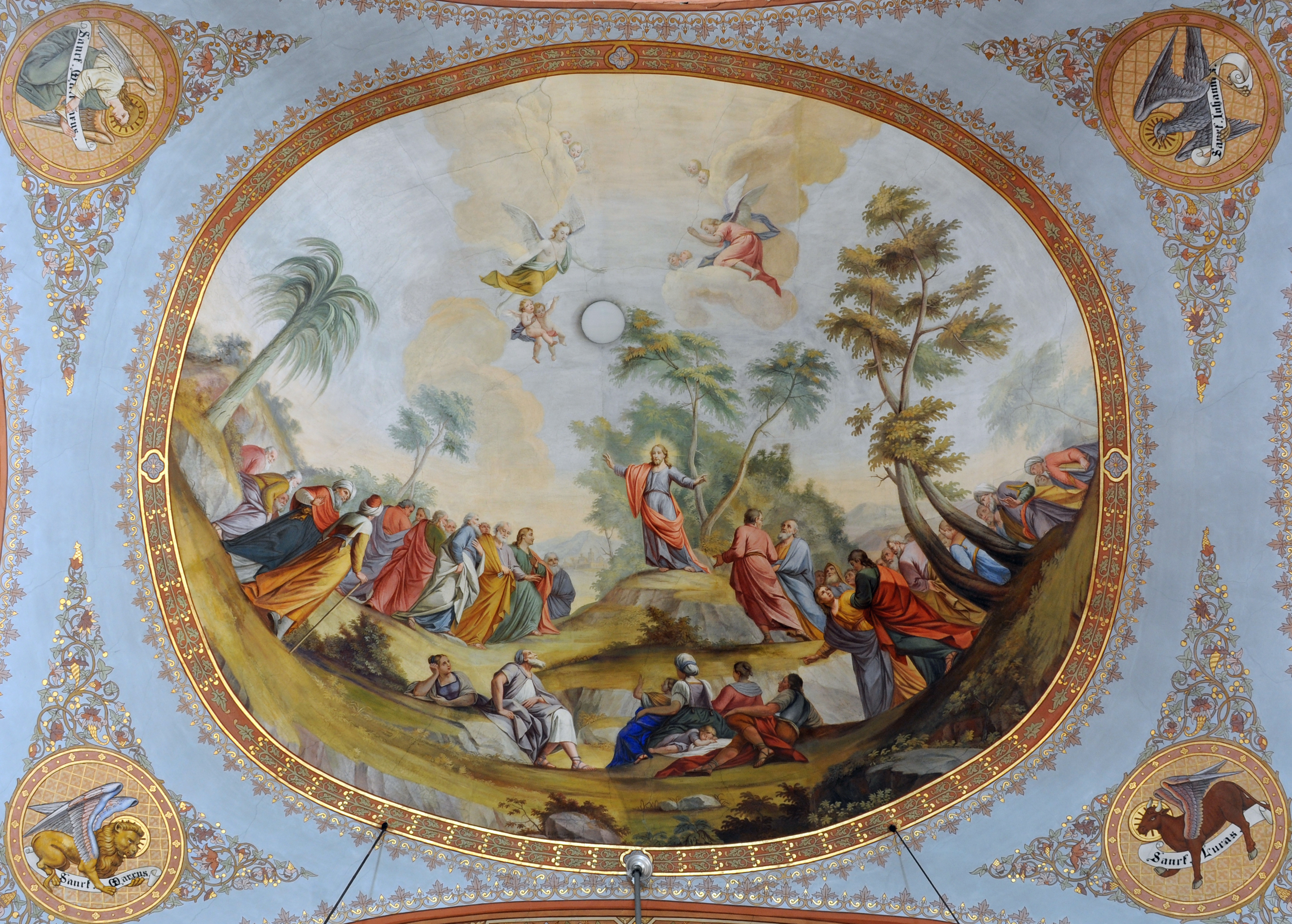
Fresco by Franz Xaver Kirchebner

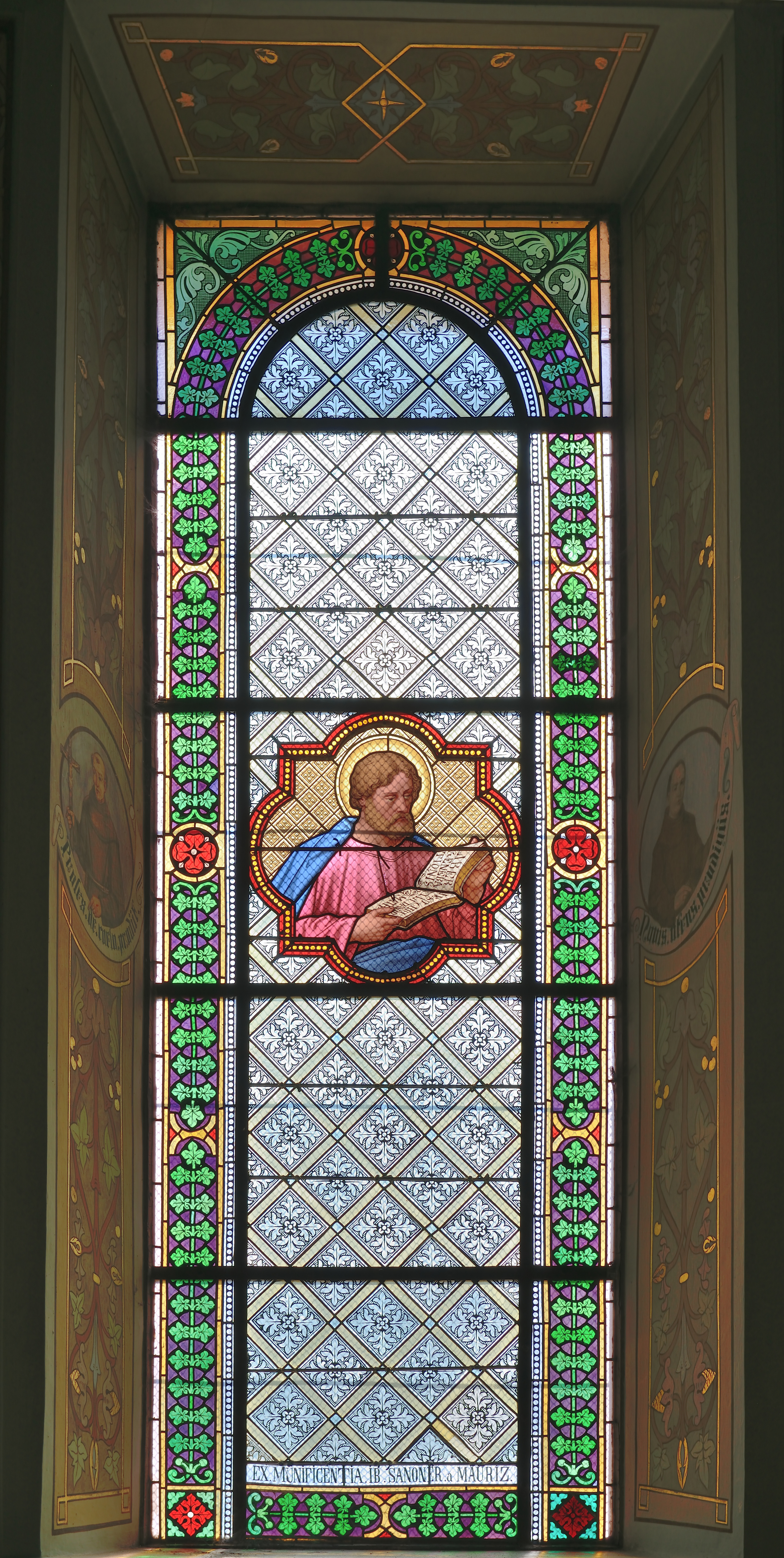
Saint Matthew Evangelist

=== Artworks ===
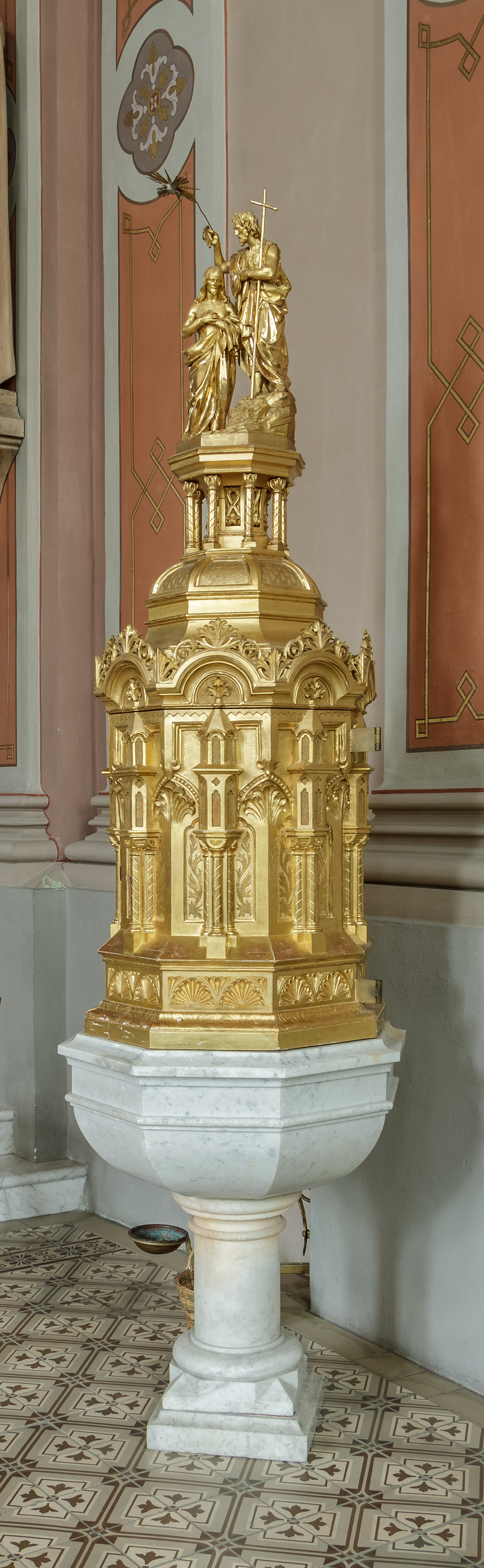
Baptismal font

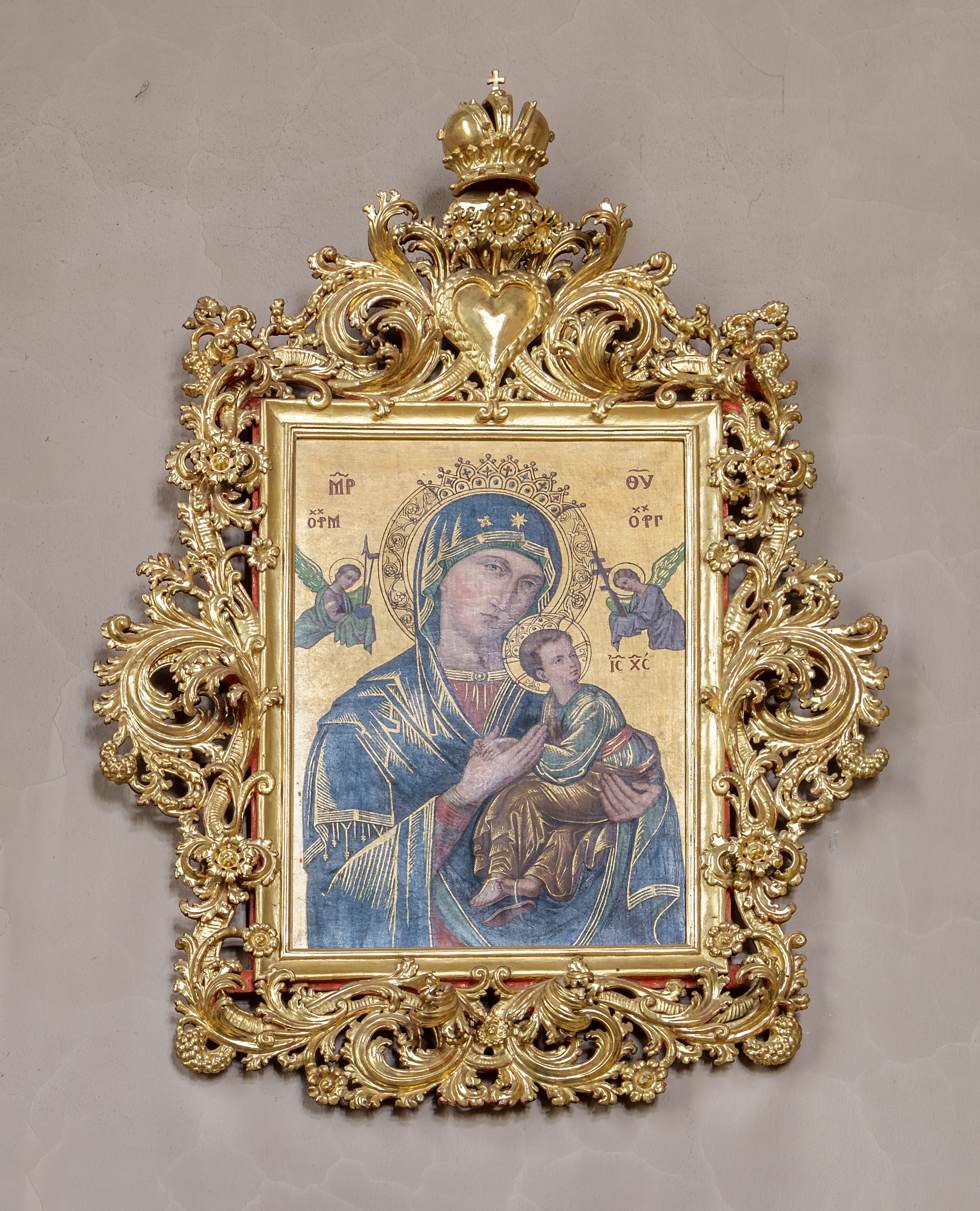
St. Mary with the child

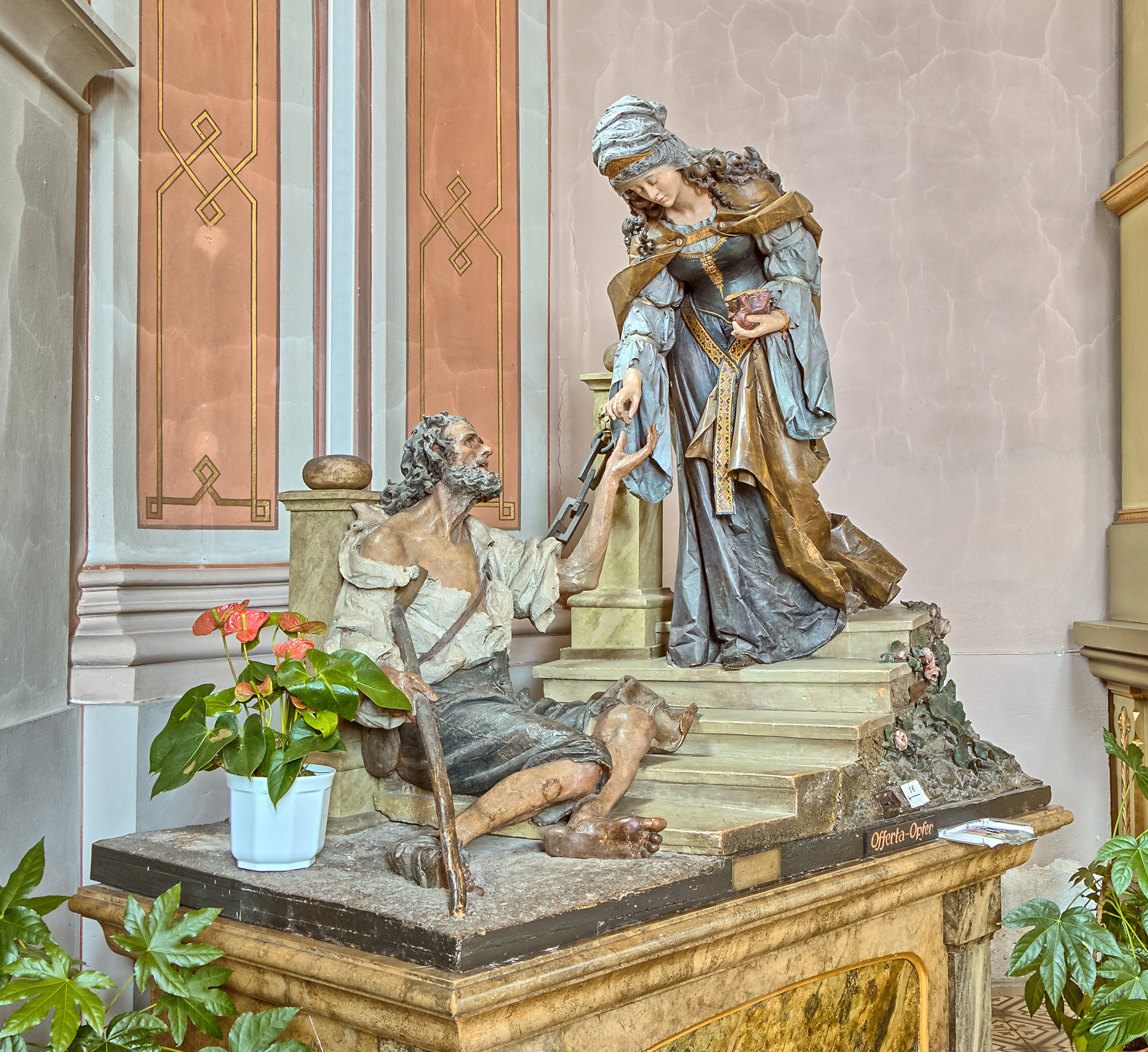
St. Elisabeth group

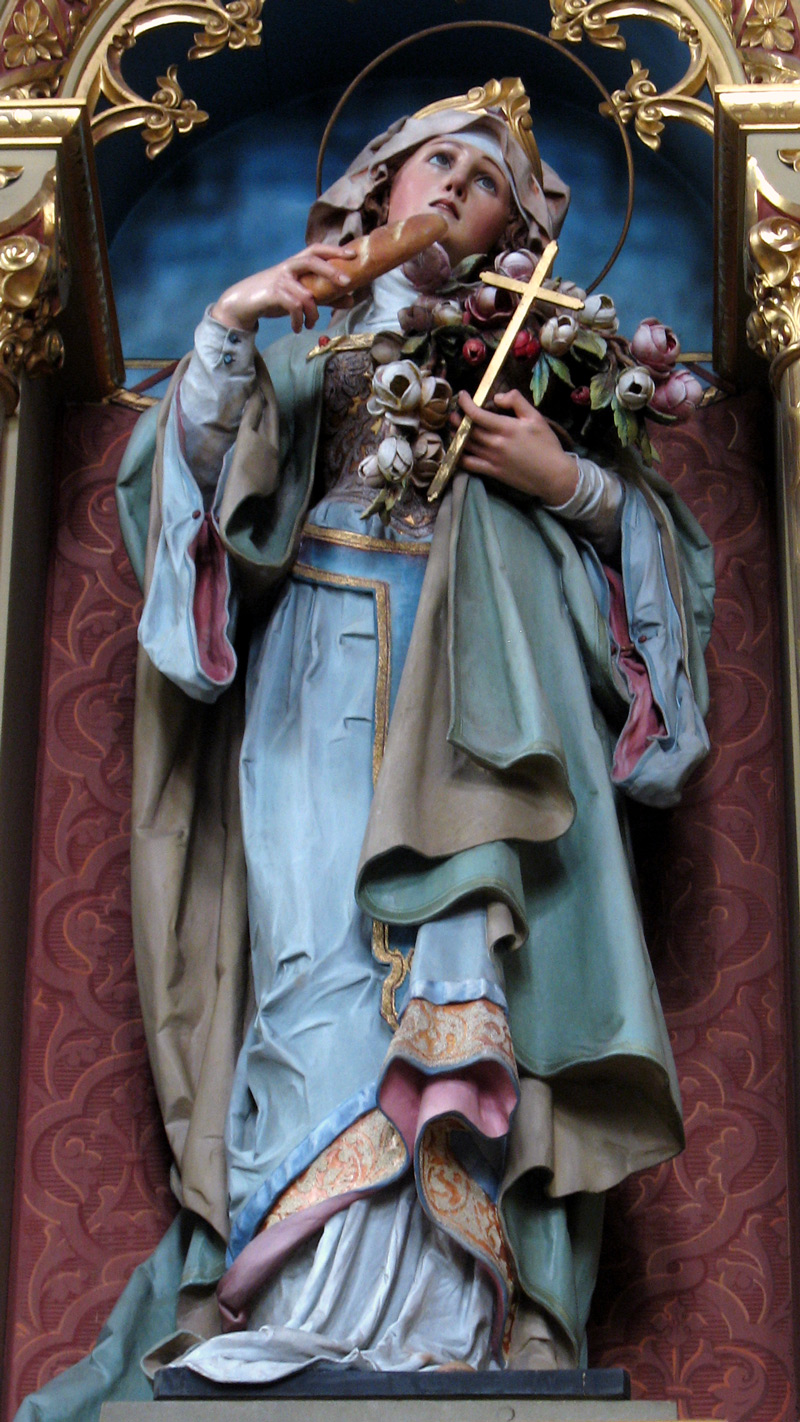
St Elizabeth of Hungary by Jakob Crepaz (late 19th or early 20th-century)

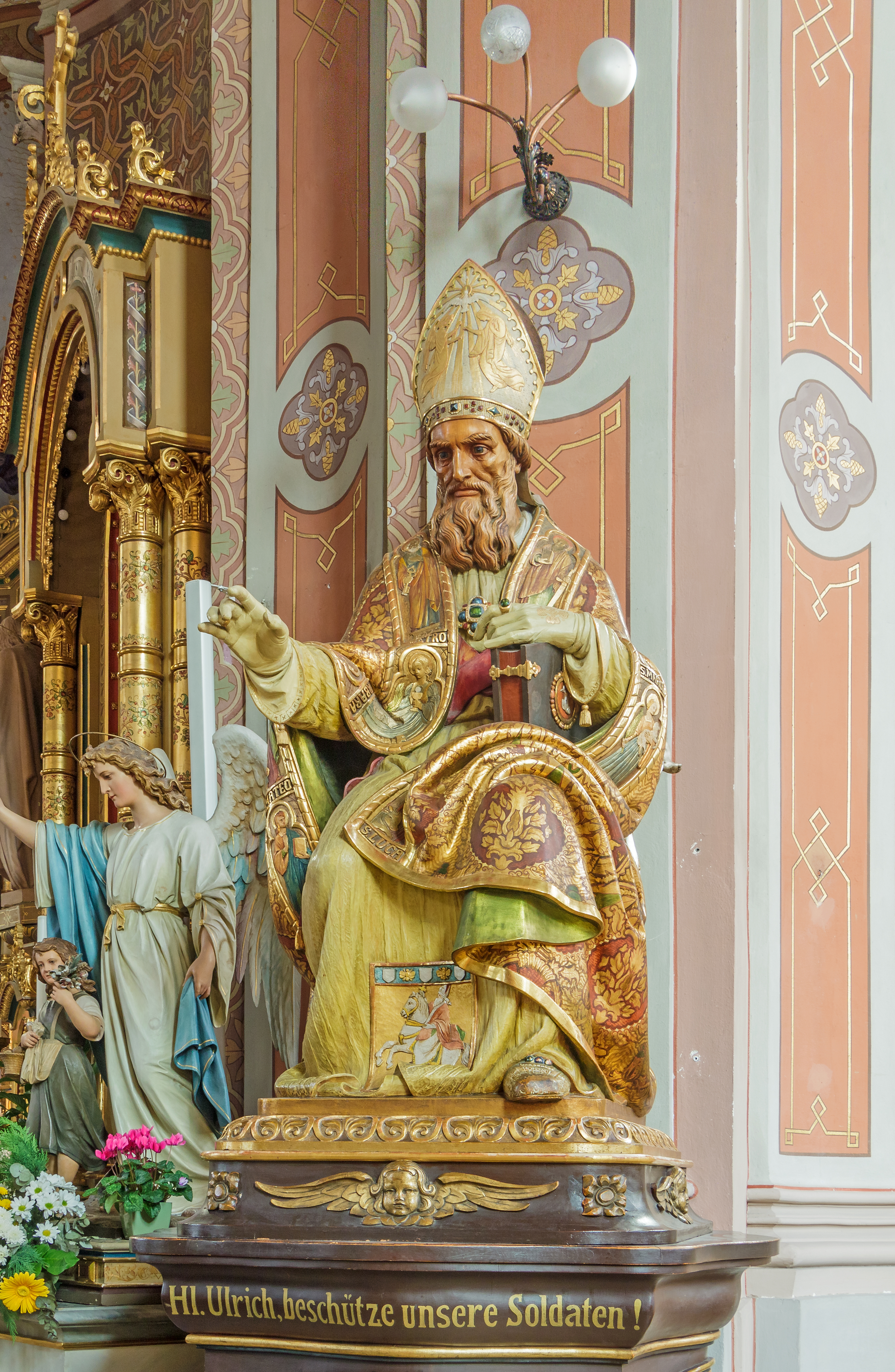
St Ulrich by Ludwig Moroder (20th-century)

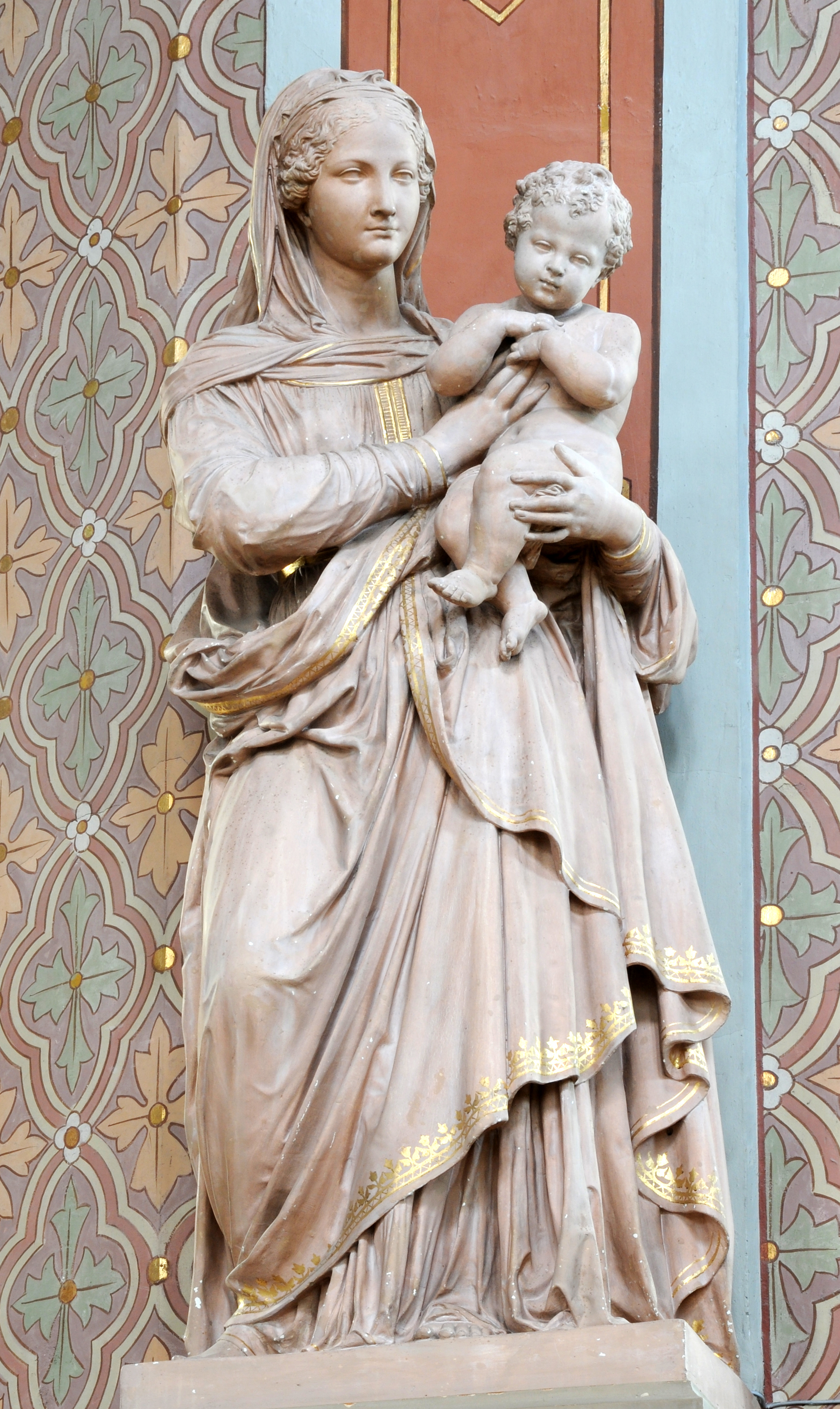
The Madonna and Christ Child, Johann Dominik Mahlknecht (early 19th-century)

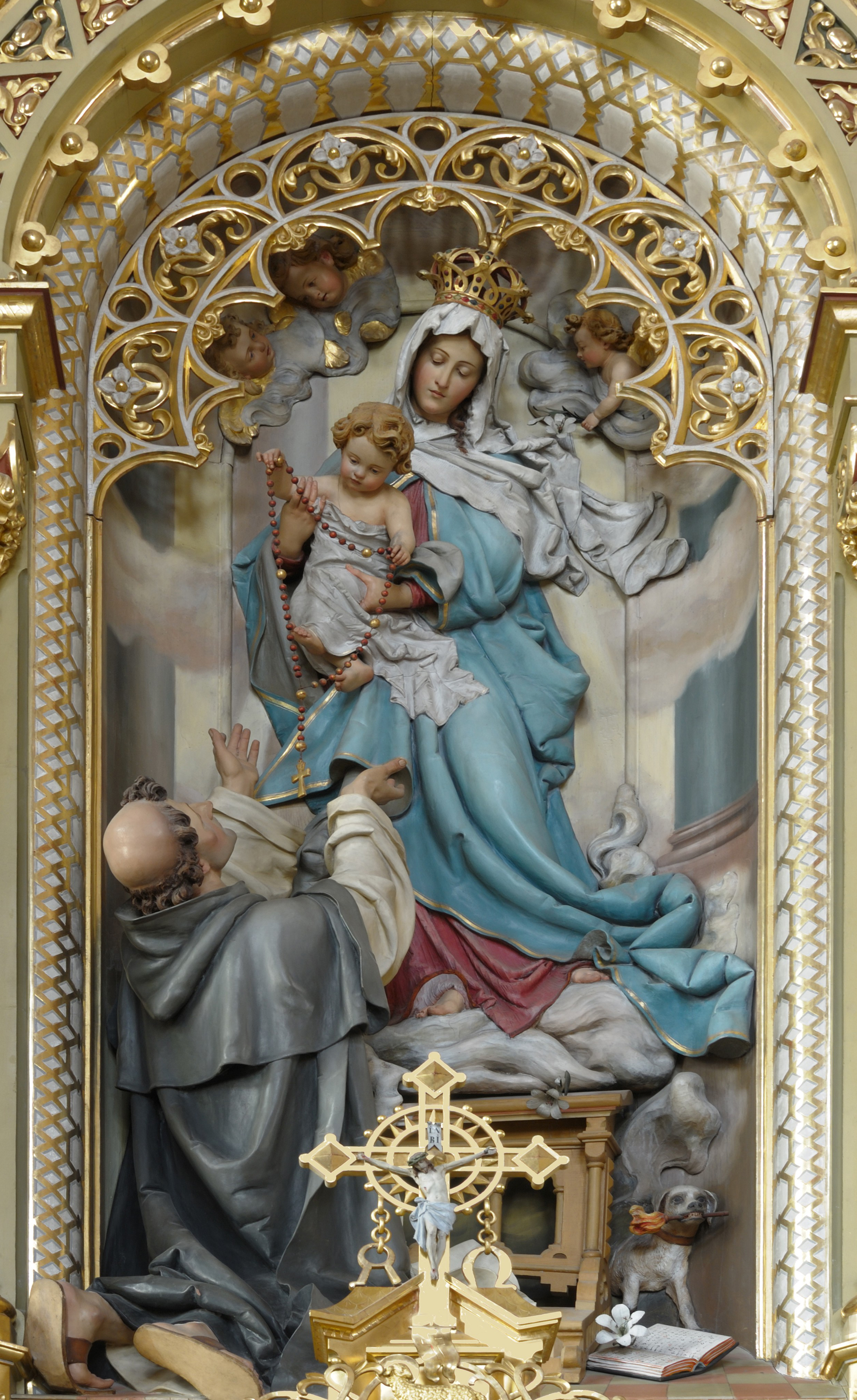
Our Lady of the Rosary, altarpiece by Josef Mersa (1905)

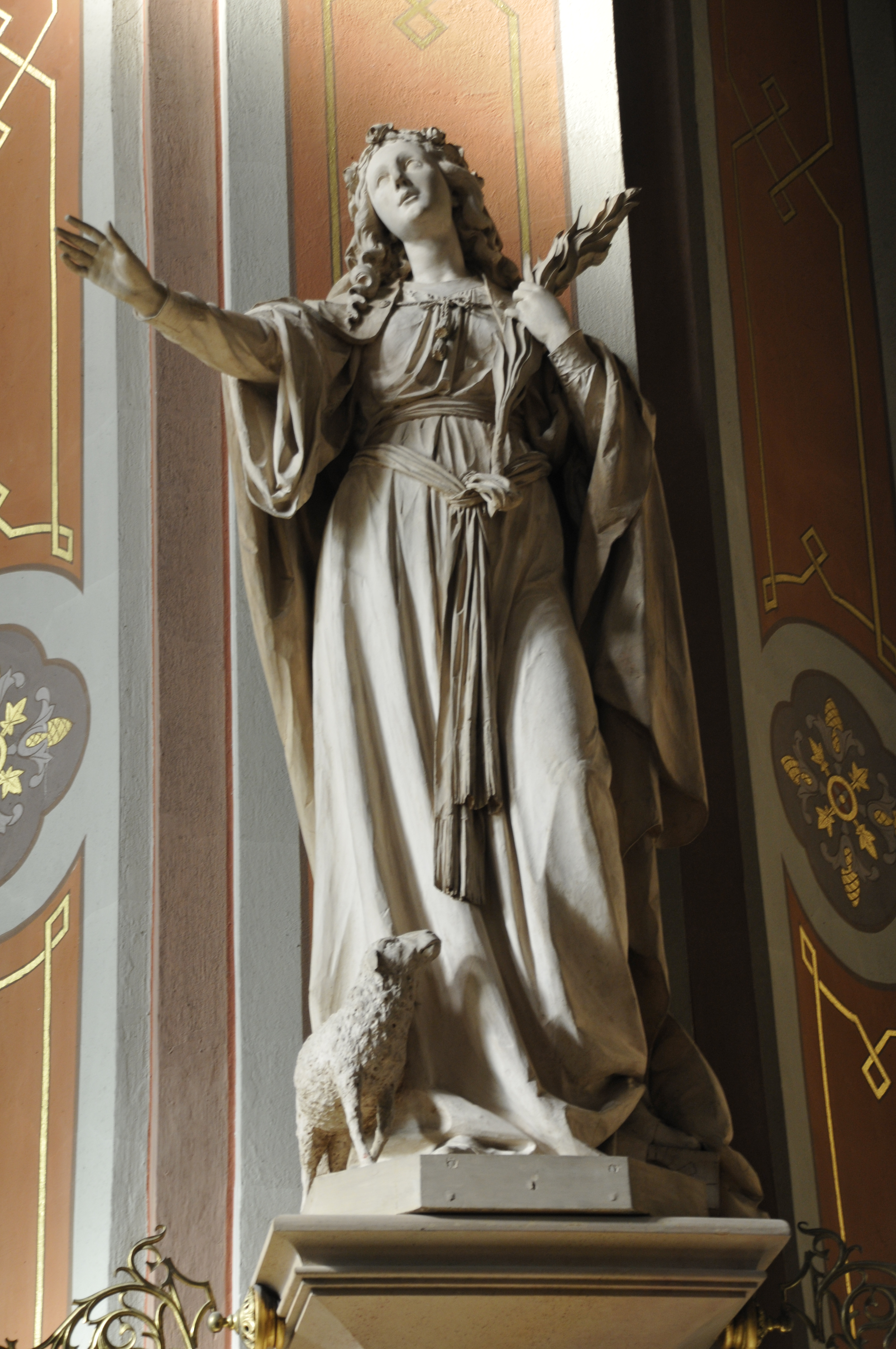
St. Agnes by Vigil Dorigo

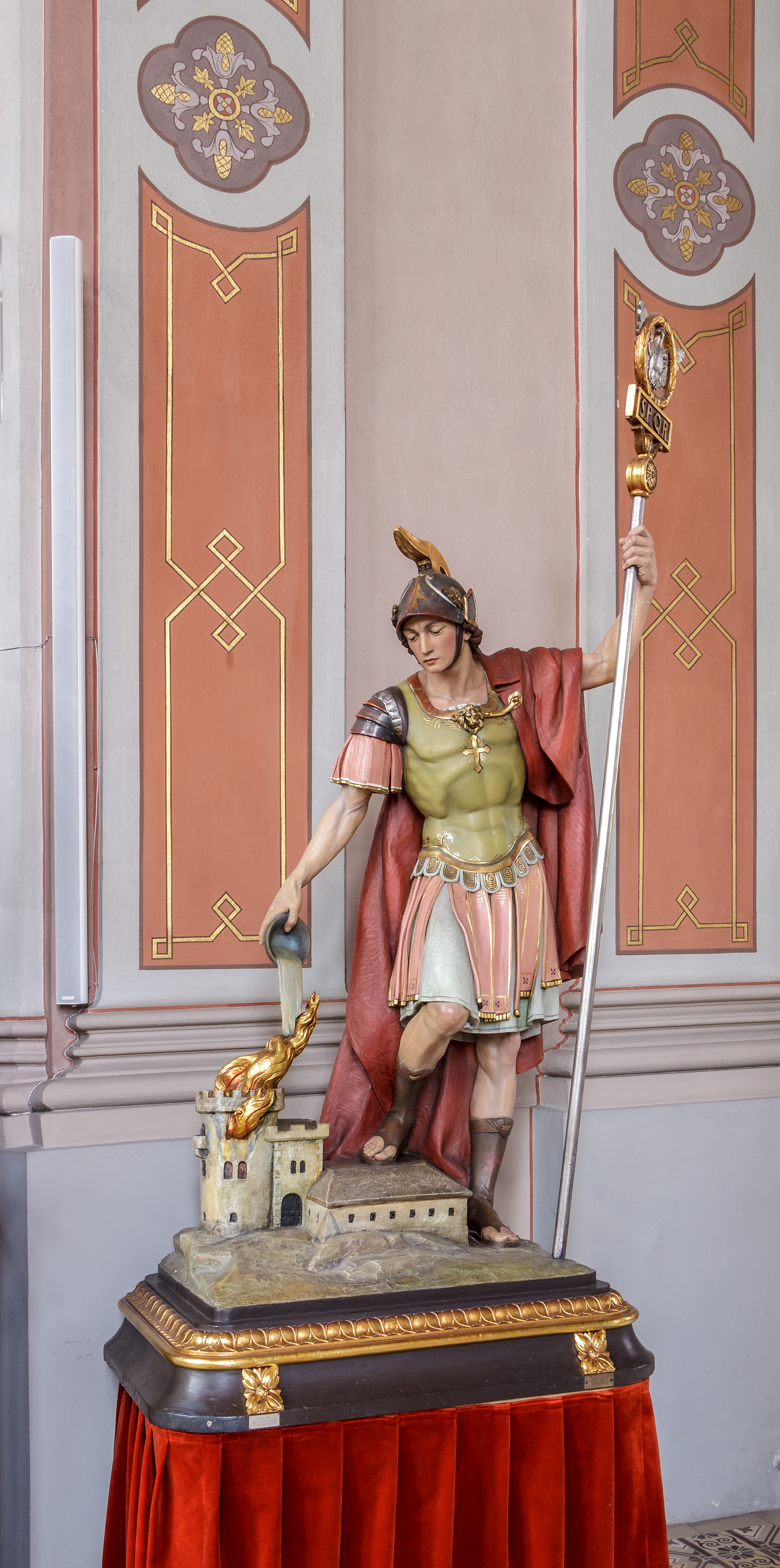
St. Florian

== Other projects ==
- Artwork in the Parish church of Urtijëi
- Dome frescos by Franz Xaver Kirchebner
- Evangelists by J.D. Mahlknecht
