= San Pietro di Cremeno, Genoa =

Church in Genoa, Italy

Church of Saint Peter in Cremeno (Chiesa di San Pietro di Cremeno)
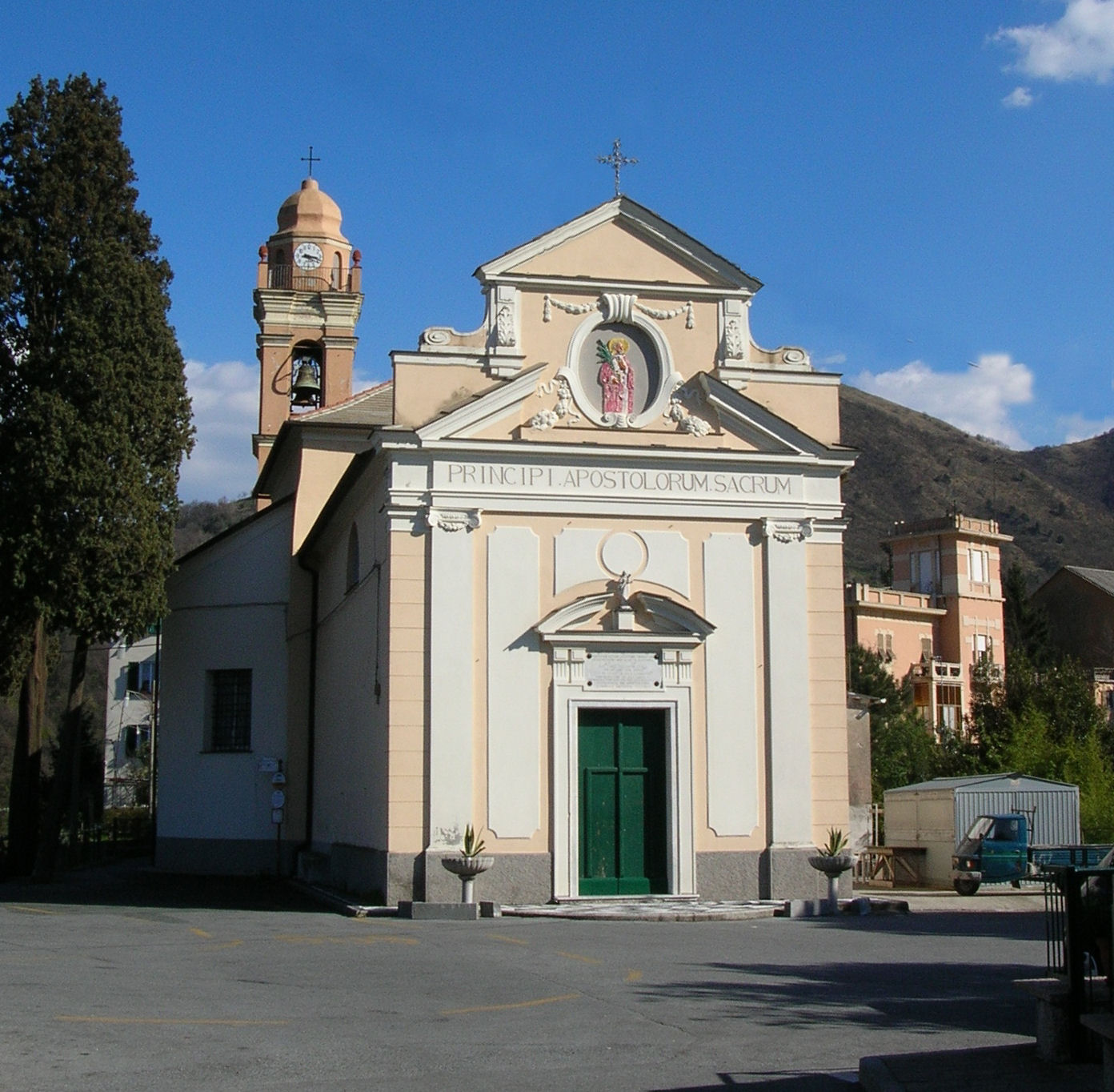
- The façade of the church.

Religion
- Affiliation: Roman Catholic
- Province: Genoa
- Year consecrated: 1807

Location
- Location: Genoa, Italy
- Interactive map of Church of Saint Peter in Cremeno (Chiesa di San Pietro di Cremeno)
- Coordinates: 44.472756°N 8.9185°E

Architecture
- Type: Church
- Style: Baroque
- Groundbreaking: 12c
- Completed: 18c

Church of Saint Peter in Cremeno (Italian: Chiesa di San Pietro di Cremeno) is a Roman Catholic church in Genoa, the capital of Liguria, Italy within the Archdiocese of Genoa.
