= List of single-artist museums =

This is a list of single–artist museums, which are museums displaying the work, or bearing the name, of a single visual artist.

Building	Museum	City	Year established	Subject	Country	ref
	Basoeki Abdullah Museum	Jakarta	2001	Basuki Abdullah	Indonesia	
	Rita Deanin Abbey Art Museum	Las Vegas	2022	Rita Deanin Abbey	United States	
	Affandi Museum	Yogyakarta	1973	Affandi	Indonesia	
	Yaacov Agam Museum of Art	Rishon LeZion	2018	Yaacov Agam	Israel	
	Nam June Paik Art Center	Yongin	2008	Nam June Paik	South Korea	
	Aivazovsky National Art Gallery	Feodosia	1845	Ivan Aivazovsky	Ukraine	
	Theodor Aman Museum	Bucharest	1908	Theodor Aman	Romania	
	Walter Anderson Museum of Art	Ocean Springs, Mississippi	1991	Walter Inglis Anderson	United States	
	Arp Museum Bahnhof Rolandseck	Rolandseck	2007	Jean Arp and Sophie Taeuber-Arp	Germany	
	Ernst Barlach House	Hamburg	1962	Ernst Barlach	Germany	
	Musée Bartholdi	Colmar	1922	Frédéric Auguste Bartholdi	France	
	Statue of Liberty Museum	Liberty Island	2019	Frédéric Auguste Bartholdi	United States	
	Samuel Bak Museum: The Learning Center	Omaha, Nebraska		Samuel Bak	United States	
	Museo Benini	Marble Falls, Texas	2015	Benini	United States	
	Musée de l'atelier Rosa Bonheur	Thomery	1909	Rosa Bonheur	France	
	Museo Botero	Bogotá	2000	Fernando Botero	Colombia	
	Musée Bourdelle	Paris	1949	Antoine Bourdelle	France	
	Miffy Museum	Utrecht	2006	Dick Bruna	Netherlands	
	Burchfield Penney Art Center	Buffalo, New York	1966	Charles Burchfield	United States	
	BenCab Museum	Baguio	2009	Benedicto Cabrera	Philippines	
	Calder Gardens	Philadelphia	2025	Alexander Calder	United States	
	Museo Canova	Possagno	1833	Antonio Canova	Italy	
	Atelier de Cézanne	Aix-en-Provence	1954	Paul Cézanne	France	
	Musée Auguste Chabaud	Graveson		Auguste Chabaud	France	
	Musée Marc Chagall	Nice	1973	Marc Chagall	France	
	Marc Chagall Museum	Vitebsk	1991	Marc Chagall	Belarus	
	Nek Chand Saini's Rock Garden of Nathupur	Chandigarh	1957	Nek Chand	India	
	Chihuly Garden and Glass	Seattle	2012	Dale Chihuly	United States	
	Giorgio de Chirico House Museum	Rome	1998	Giorgio de Chirico	Italy	
	Olana State Historic Site	Greenport, Columbia County, New York	1966	Frederic Edwin Church	United States	
	Musée Camille Claudel	Nogent-sur-Seine	2017	Camille Claudel	France	
	Jean Cocteau Museum	Menton	2011	Jean Cocteau	France	
	Maison La Roche	Paris		Le Corbusier	France	
	Musée Courbet	Ornans	1971	Gustave Courbet	France	
	Ever Rest	Hastings-on-Hudson, New York		Jasper Francis Cropsey	United States	
	Dalí Theatre and Museum	Figueres	1974	Salvador Dalí	Spain	
	Salvador Dalí House Museum	Portlligat	1997	Salvador Dalí	Spain	
	Salvador Dalí Museum	St. Petersburg, Florida	1982	Salvador Dalí	United States	
	Dalí Paris	Paris	1991	Salvador Dalí	France	
	Dalí – Die Ausstellung am Potsdamer Platz	Berlin	2009	Salvador Dalí	Germany	
	Cyrus Dallin Art Museum	Arlington, Massachusetts	1985	Cyrus Edwin Dallin	United States	
	FeliX Art & Eco Museum	Drogenbos	1996	Felix De Boeck	Belgium	
	Musée national Eugène Delacroix	Paris	1971	Eugène Delacroix	France	
	Paul Delvaux Museum	Saint-Idesbald	1982	Paul Delvaux	Belgium	
	Demuth Museum of Art	Lancaster, Pennsylvania		Charles Demuth	United States	
	Musée départemental Maurice-Denis	Paris	1976	Maurice Denis	France	
	Museum Haus Dix	Hemmenhofen	2013	Otto Dix	Germany	
	Otto-Dix-Haus	Gera	1991	Otto Dix	Germany	
	Döderhultarn Museum	Oskarshamn	1911	Axel Petersson Döderhultarn	Sweden	
	Doğançay Museum	Istanbul	2004	Burhan Dogancay	Turkey	
	Fondation Jean Dubuffet	Paris	1973	Jean Dubuffet	France	
	Stasys Museum	Panevėžys	2024	Stasys Eidrigevičius	Lithuania	
	El Greco Museum	Toledo	1911	El Greco	Spain	
	Museum of El Greco	Fodele	1998	El Greco	Greece	
	James Ensor House	Ostend	1952	James Ensor	Belgium	
	Escher in the Palace	The Hague	2002	M.C. Escher	Netherlands	
	Taos Art Museum at Fechin House	Taos, New Mexico	1994	Nicolai Fechin	United States	
	Fondation Folon	La Hulpe	2000	Jean-Michel Folon	Belgium	
	The Foster Museum	Palo Alto, California	2016	Tony Foster	United States	
	Villa-musée Jean-Honoré-Fragonard	Grasse		Jean-Honoré Fragonard	France	
	Marshall M. Fredericks Sculpture Museum	University Center, Michigan	1988	Marshall Fredericks	United States	
	Chesterwood	Stockbridge, Massachusetts		Daniel Chester French	United States	
	Ernst Fuchs Private Museum	Vienna		Ernst Fuchs	Austria	
	Gainsborough's House	Sudbury, Suffolk	1961	Thomas Gainsborough	United Kingdom	
	Gaudí House Museum	Barcelona	1963	Antoni Gaudí	Spain	
	Gaudí Centre	Reus	2007	Antoni Gaudí	Spain	
	Paul Gauguin Museum	Tahiti	1965	Paul Gauguin	France	
	Museum Franz Gertsch	Burgdorf	2002	Franz Gertsch	Switzerland	
	Ilya Glazunov Moscow State Art Gallery	Moscow	2004	Ilya Glazunov	Russia	
	Casa natal de Goya	Fuendetodos	1989	Francisco Goya	Spain	
	Museo del Grabado de Goya	Fuendetodos	1989	Francisco Goya	Spain	
	Gutenberg Museum	Mainz	1900	Johannes Gutenberg	Germany	
	Nahum Gutman Museum of Art	Neve Tzedek	1998	Nahum Gutman	Israel	
	Frans Hals Museum	Haarlem	1862	Frans Hals	Netherlands	
	Nakamura Keith Haring Collection	Hokuto	2007	Keith Haring	Japan	
	Musée national Jean-Jacques Henner	Paris	1924	Jean-Jacques Henner	France	
	Robert Henri Museum	Cozad, Nebraska		Robert Henri	United States	
	Barbara Hepworth Museum and Sculpture Garden	St Ives, Cornwall	1976	Barbara Hepworth	United Kingdom	
	Musée Hergé	Louvain-la-Neuve	2009	Hergé	Belgium	
	Nakagawa-machi Batō Hiroshige Museum of Art	Nakagawa, Tochigi	2000	Hiroshige	Japan	
	Bror Hjorths Hus	Uppsala	1978	Bror Hjorth	Sweden	
	Hogarth's House	London	1904	William Hogarth	United Kingdom	
	Horta Museum	Brussels	1969	Victor Horta	Belgium	
	Grace Hudson Museum	Ukiah, California	1986	Grace Hudson	United States	
	KunstHausWien	Vienna	1991	Friedensreich Hundertwasser	Austria	
	Musée Ingres Bourdelle	Montauban	1854	Jean-Auguste-Dominique Ingres and Antoine Bourdelle	France	
	Museum Jorn	Silkeborg	1965	Asger Jorn	Denmark	
	Frida Kahlo Museum	Mexico City	1957	Frida Kahlo	Mexico	
	Angelika Kauffmann Museum	Schwarzenberg	2007	Angelika Kauffmann	Austria	
	Whanki Museum	Seoul	1992	Whanki Kim	South Korea	
	Kirkland Museum of Fine & Decorative Art	Denver	2003	Vance Kirkland	United States	
	Zentrum Paul Klee	Bern	2005	Paul Klee	Switzerland	
	Klimt Villa	Vienna	2012	Gustav Klimt	Austria	
	Georg-Kolbe-Museum	Berlin		Georg Kolbe	Germany	
	Käthe Kollwitz Museum	Cologne	1985	Käthe Kollwitz	Germany	
	Käthe Kollwitz Museum	Berlin	1986	Käthe Kollwitz	Germany	
	Käthe Kollwitz House	Moritzburg	1995	Käthe Kollwitz	Germany	
	Yayoi Kusama Museum	Tokyo	2017	Yayoi Kusama	Japan	
	Johannes Larsen Museum	Kerteminde	1986	Johannes Larsen	Denmark	
	Fernand Léger National Museum	Biot, Alpes-Maritimes	1960	Fernand Léger	France	
	Liebermann Villa	Berlin	2006	Max Liebermann	Germany	
	Leighton House Museum	London	1929	Frederic Leighton	United Kingdom	
	Norman Lindsay Gallery and Museum	Faulconbridge, New South Wales		Norman Lindsay	Australia	
	Museo Baltasar Lobo	Zamora	2007	Baltasar Lobo	Spain	
	August–Macke–Haus	Bonn	1991	August Macke	Germany	
	Magritte Museum	Brussels	2009	René Magritte	Belgium	
	René Magritte Museum	Brussels	1999	René Magritte	Belgium	
	Musée Maillol	Paris	1995	Aristide Maillol	France	
	Musée Maillol Banyuls–sur–Mer	Banyuls-sur-Mer	1994	Aristide Maillol	France	
	José Malhoa Museum	Caldas da Rainha		José Malhoa	Portugal	
	Fundación César Manrique	Teguise	1982	César Manrique	Spain	
	Franz Marc Museum	Kochel	1986	Franz Marc	Germany	
	Jan Matejko Manor House	Kraków	1965	Jan Matejko	Poland	
	Jan Matejko House	Kraków	1895	Jan Matejko	Poland	
	Musée Matisse	Nice	1963	Henri Matisse	France	
	Matisse Museum	Le Cateau-Cambrésis	1952	Henri Matisse	France	
	Le Mayeur Museum	Sanur, Bali	1957	Adrien-Jean Le Mayeur	Indonesia	
	Mill of Kintail	Mississippi Mills, Ontario		R. Tait McKenzie	Canada	
	Medina Museum	Braga	1984	Henrique Medina	Portugal	
	Gari Melchers Home and Studio	Falmouth, Virginia		Gari Melchers	United States	
	Meunier Museum	Brussels	1939	Constantin Meunier	Belgium	
	Casa Buonarroti	Florence		Michelangelo	Italy	
	Michelson Museum of Art	Marshall, Texas		Leo Michelson	United States	
	Millesgården	Stockholm	1936	Carl Milles	Sweden	
	Fundació Joan Miró	Barcelona	1975	Joan Miró	Spain	
	Fundació Pilar i Joan Miró in Mallorca	Palma de Mallorca	1992	Joan Miró	Spain	
	Paula Modersohn-Becker Museum	Bremen	1927	Paula Modersohn-Becker	Germany	
	Musée Marmottan Monet	Paris	1934	Claude Monet	France	
	Maison et jardins de Claude-Monet - Giverny	Giverny	1980	Claude Monet	France	
	Henry Moore Foundation	Perry Green, Hertfordshire	1977	Henry Moore	United Kingdom	
	Thomas and Mary Nimmo Moran House	East Hampton, New York		Thomas and Mary Nimmo Moran	United States	
	Musée national Gustave Moreau	Paris	1903	Gustave Moreau	France	
	William Morris Gallery	London	1950	William Morris	United Kingdom	
	Munch Museum	Oslo	1963	Edvard Munch	Norway	
	Elisabet Ney Museum	Austin, Texas		Elisabet Ney	United States	
	nitsch museum	Mistelbach		Hermann Nitsch	Austria	
	Noguchi Museum	New York City	1985	Isamu Noguchi	United States	
	Ohr–O'Keefe Museum of Art	Biloxi, Mississippi	1989	George Ohr	United States	
	Georgia O'Keeffe Museum	Santa Fe, New Mexico	1997	Georgia O'Keeffe	United States	
	Georgia O'Keeffe Home and Studio	Abiquiú, New Mexico	1989	Georgia O'Keeffe	United States	
	Theodor Pallady Museum	Bucharest	1971	Theodor Pallady	Romania	
	Anton Pieck Museum	Hattem	1984	Anton Pieck	Netherlands	
	Musée Picasso	Antibes	1925	Pablo Picasso	France	
	Musée Picasso Paris	Paris	1985	Pablo Picasso	France	
	Museu Picasso	Barcelona	1963	Pablo Picasso	Spain	
	Fundación Picasso	Málaga	1988	Pablo Picasso	Spain	
	Museo Picasso Málaga	Málaga	2003	Pablo Picasso	Spain	
	Atelier-Museu Júlio Pomar	Lisbon	2013	Júlio Pomar	Portugal	
	Musée Nicolas Poussin	Les Andelys	1971	Nicolas Poussin	France	
	Arnulf Rainer Museum	Baden bei Wien	2009	Arnulf Rainer	Austria	
	Roger Raveel Museum	Machelen, Zulte	1999	Roger Raveel	Belgium	
	Rembrandt House Museum	Amsterdam	1911	Rembrandt	Netherlands	
	Casa das Histórias Paula Rego	Cascais	2009	Paula Rego	Portugal	
	Frederic Remington Art Museum	Ogdensburg, New York	1923	Frederic Remington	United States	
	Pinacoteca Diego Rivera	Xalapa	1998	Diego Rivera	Mexico	
	Museo Mural Diego Rivera	Mexico City	1988	Diego Rivera	Mexico	
	Heath Robinson Museum	London	2016	W. Heath Robinson	United Kingdom	
	Norman Rockwell Museum	Stockbridge, Massachusetts	1969	Norman Rockwell	United States	
	Musée Rodin	Paris	1919	Auguste Rodin	France	
	Julio Romero de Torres Museum	Córdoba	1931	Julio Romero de Torres	Spain	
	Musée Félicien Rops	Namur	1987	Félicien Rops	Belgium	
	Rubenshuis	Antwerp	1946	Peter Paul Rubens	Belgium	
	C. M. Russell Museum Complex	Great Falls, Montana	1953	Charles Marion Russell	United States	
	Saint-Gaudens National Historical Park	Cornish, New Hampshire	1927	Augustus Saint-Gaudens	United States	
	Sir John Soane's Museum	London	1837	John Soane	United Kingdom	
	Jens Søndergaards Museum	Bovbjerg	1958	Jens Søndergaard	Danmark	
	Sorolla Museum	Madrid	1932	Joaquín Sorolla	Spain	
	Stanley Spencer Gallery	Cookham	1962	Stanley Spencer	United Kingdom	
	Clyfford Still Museum	Denver	2011	Clyfford Still	United States	
	Gilbert Stuart Birthplace and Museum	Saunderstown, Rhode Island	1931	Gilbert Stuart	United States	
	Villa Stuck	Munich	1992	Franz Stuck	Germany	
	Hermann Struck Museum	Haifa		Hermann Struck	Israel	
	Talberg Museum	Offenbach		Ruben Talberg	Germany	
	Museo Rufino Tamayo	Mexico City	1981	Rufino Tamayo	Mexico	
	Rudolph Tegner Museum	Dronningmølle	1981	Rudolph Tegner	Danmark	
	Steffen Thomas Museum of Art	Buckhead, Morgan County, Georgia	1997	Steffen Thomas	United States	
	Thorvaldsen Museum	Copenhagen	1848	Bertel Thorvaldsen	Danmark	
	Museum Tinguely	Basel		Jean Tinguely	Switzerland	
	Musée Toulouse-Lautrec	Albi	1905	Henri de Toulouse-Lautrec	France	
	James Turrell Museum	Colomé		James Turrell	Argentina	
	Shoji Ueda Museum of Photography	Saihaku–gun, Tottori	1995	Shoji Ueda	Japan	
	Umlauf Sculpture Garden and Museum	Austin, Texas	1985	Charles Umlauf	United States	
	Frederick Horsman Varley Art Gallery	Markham, Ontario	1997	Frederick Varley	Canada	
	Van Gogh Museum	Amsterdam	1973	Vincent van Gogh	Netherlands	
	Van Gogh House	Nieuw-Amsterdam	2003	Vincent van Gogh	Netherlands	
	Maison Van Gogh	Mons	1972	Vincent van Gogh	Belgium	
	Eugeen Van Mieghem Museum	Antwerp		Eugeen Van Mieghem	Belgium	
	The Andy Warhol Museum	Pittsburgh	1994	Andy Warhol	United States	
	Andy Warhol Museum of Modern Art	Medzilaborce	1991	Andy Warhol	Slovakia	
	Watts Gallery	Compton, England	1904	George Frederic Watts	United Kingdom	
	Brett Whiteley Studio	Sydney	1995	Brett Whiteley	Australia	
	Wiertz Museum	Brussels	1868	Antoine Wiertz	Belgium	
	Willumsens Museum	Frederikssund	1957	Jens Ferdinand Willumsen	Danmark	
	Brandywine River Museum of Art	Chadds Ford, Pennsylvania	1971	N. C. Wyeth and family	United States	
	Teruko Yokoi Hinagashi Museum	Ena, Gifu		Teruko Yokoi	Japan	
	Yokoi Teruko Fuji Museum of Art	Fuji, Shizuoka		Teruko Yokoi	Japan	
	Marlene Yu Museum	Shreveport, Louisiana		Marlene Tseng Yu	United States	
	Musée Zadkine	Paris	1982	Ossip Zadkine	France	
	Zorn Collections	Mora		Anders Zorn	Sweden	

== See also ==
- Category:Museums devoted to one artist
- List of art museums
- List of most visited art museums
- List of largest art museums
- List of museums devoted to one photographer
