= Museo Benini =

Single artist museum in the Texas Hill Country

Coordinates: 30°32′51″N 98°13′54″W

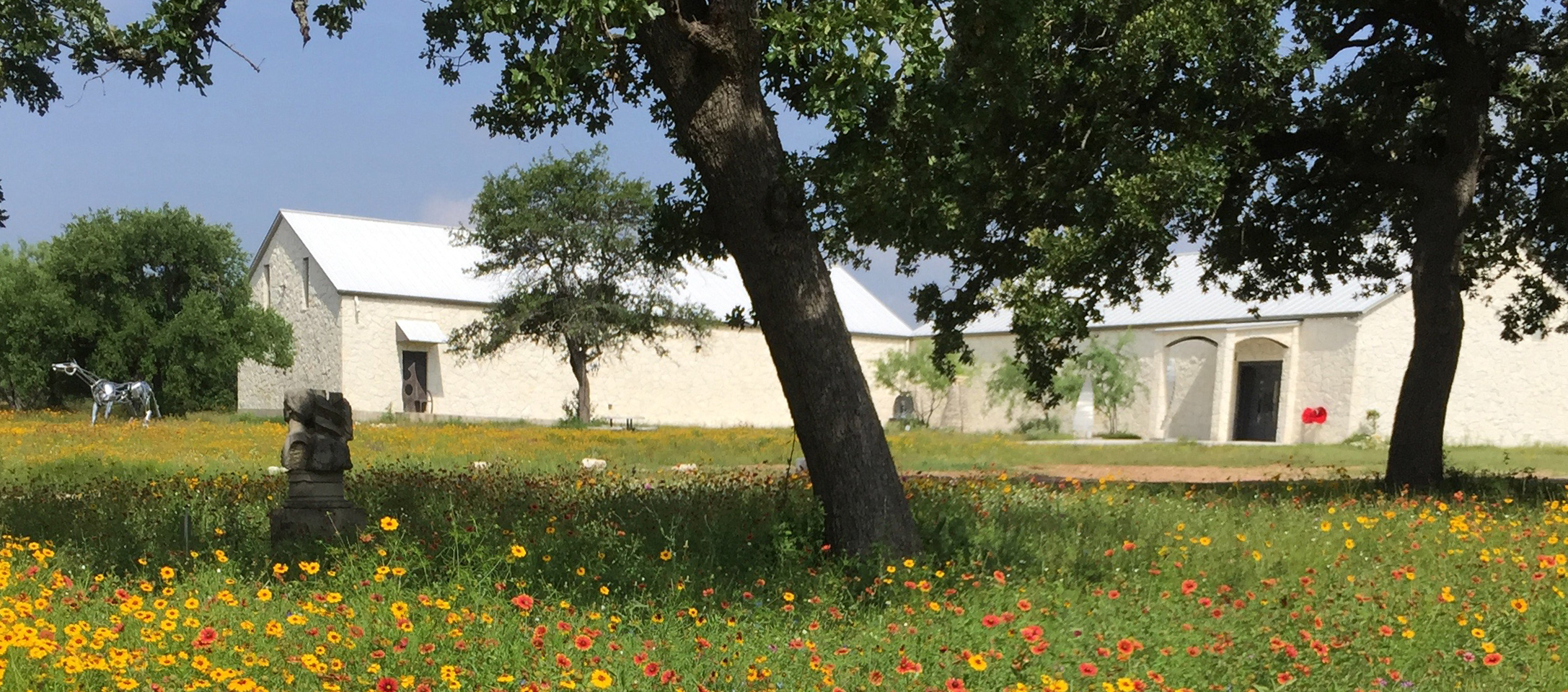
Museo Benini, Marble Falls, Texas

Museo Benini is a single-artist museum dedicated to the work of Italian artist Benini, born in Imola in the Emilia-Romagna region in 1941. It is in the Texas Hill Country, 47 miles northwest of Austin, Texas which is the home of two other single-artist museums: the Elisabet Ney Museum and the Umlauf Sculpture Garden and Museum. The museum, as well as a compound of other buildings, is set in 35 acres just south of the city of Marble Falls.

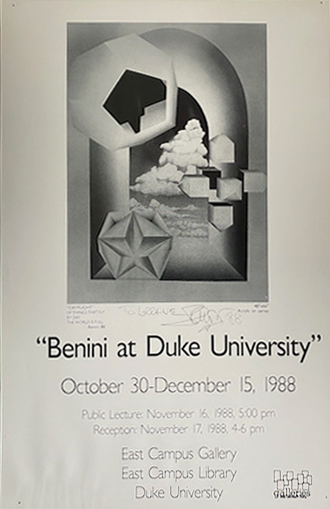
Benini exhibition at Duke University

Built in 2015, Museo Benini showcases the contemporary artist's lifetime work, featuring paintings spanning more than sixty years. On exhibit are his early "superroses", geometric paintings, and more recent works of an abstract nature. In her April 2020 article for Sightlines magazine, Austin arts writer Barbara Purcell noted, "Museo Benini is the rare single artist museum where the artist is still alive and working." In her article for Glasstire magazine in August 2020, A Visit to Museo Benini in Marble Falls, Purcell states, "Entering the museum is like entering a church..."

== See also ==
- List of single-artist museums
