= Peasant Woman Digging Up Potatoes =

Painting by Vincent van Gogh

Peasant Woman Digging up Potatoes
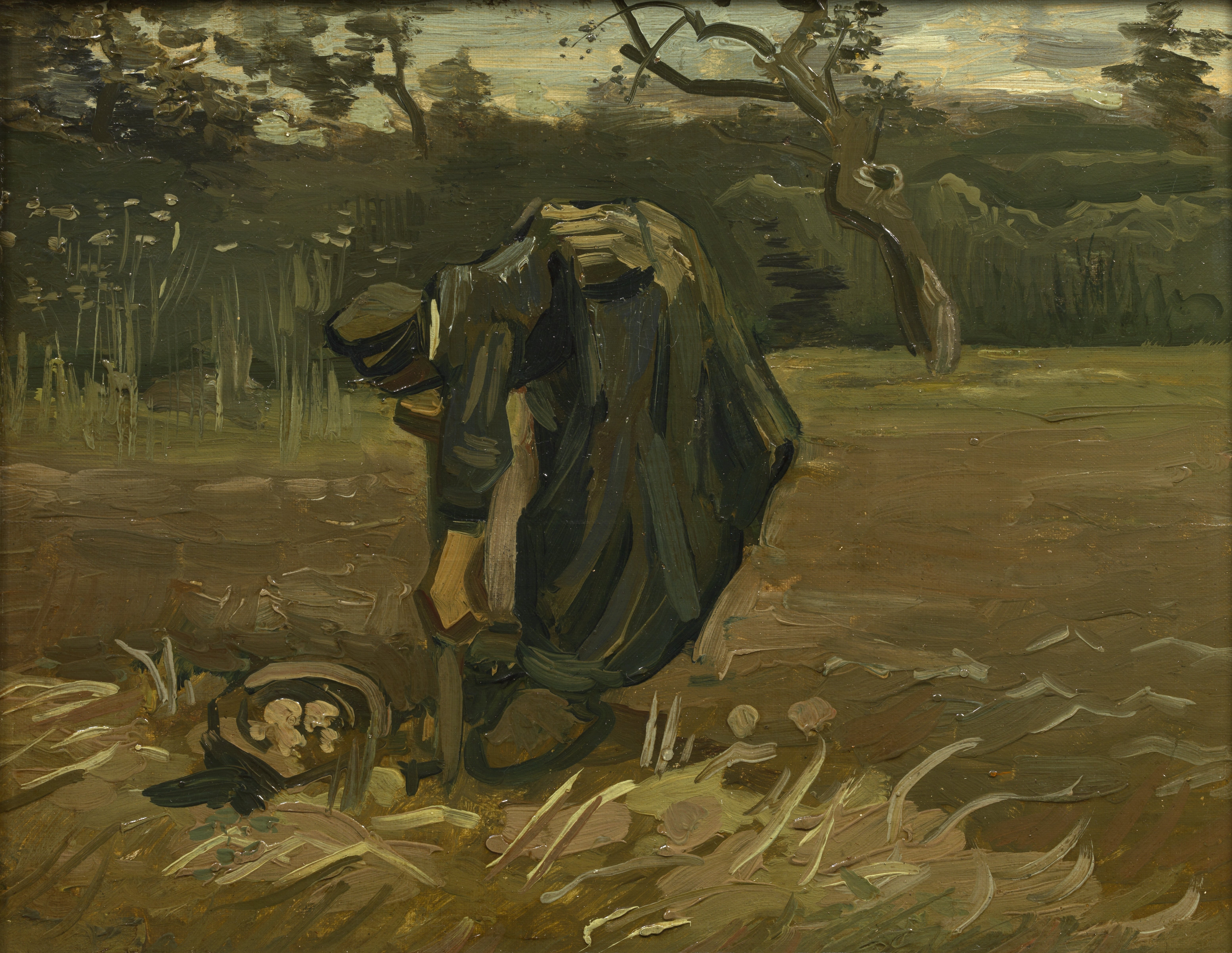
- Artist: Vincent van Gogh
- Year: 1885
- Catalogue: F98; JH901
- Medium: Oil on canvas on panel
- Dimensions: 31.5 cm × 38.0 cm (12.4 in × 15.0 in)
- Location: Royal Museum of Fine Arts Antwerp; Antwerp

Peasant Woman Digging Up Potatoes is a painting by Vincent van Gogh, probably painted in 1885. It is now in the Royal Museum of Fine Arts, Antwerp. It is oil on canvas mounted on panel.

Between 1883 and 1885 van Gogh worked in the villages of Nieuw-Amsterdam, Netherlands and Nuenen, where the poor soil made it almost impossible for farm workers and smallholders to survive. Inspired by Jean-François Millet, who he saw as the "eternal master" of the peasant genre, van Gogh saw the peasants as pious people ennobled by their hard labour and depicted them in several of what he called his 'clog works'. In mid July 1885 he produced "six or so large canvases", including The Potato Eaters. He then decided to "only make small works for now", meaning figure studies such as Peasant Woman Digging Up Potatoes.

The work was initially owned by J. Willebeek le Mair then by an unnamed owner before being sold at auction, where its present owner was able to buy it thanks to the mediation of the Palace of Fine Arts in Brussels. The Museum's chief curator Walther Vanbeselaere wrote that it was "The only, excellent work from Vincent's dark time in Holland still in Flemish hands (collection of Roland Leten, Ghent). The only Van Gogh in our collection, thanks to the low price (300,000 francs) at which it was auctioned".

== See also ==
- List of works by Vincent van Gogh
