= Ruben Talberg =

German sculptor (born 1964)

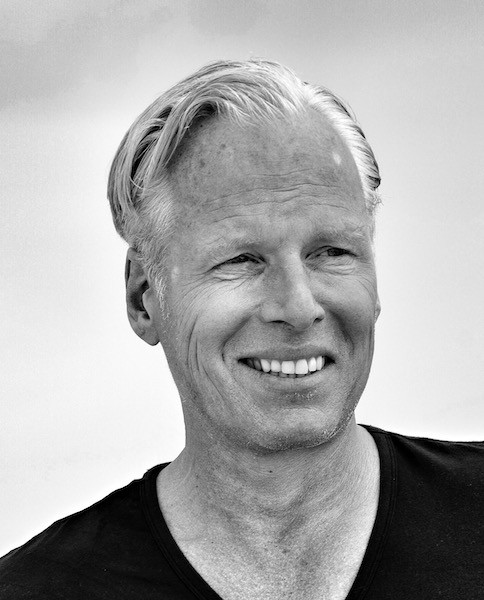
- Ruben Talberg
- Born: 24 August 1964; Heidelberg, Germany
- Known for: King of Flow, Neo~Fluxus, 888 NFDs
- Website: talberg.org

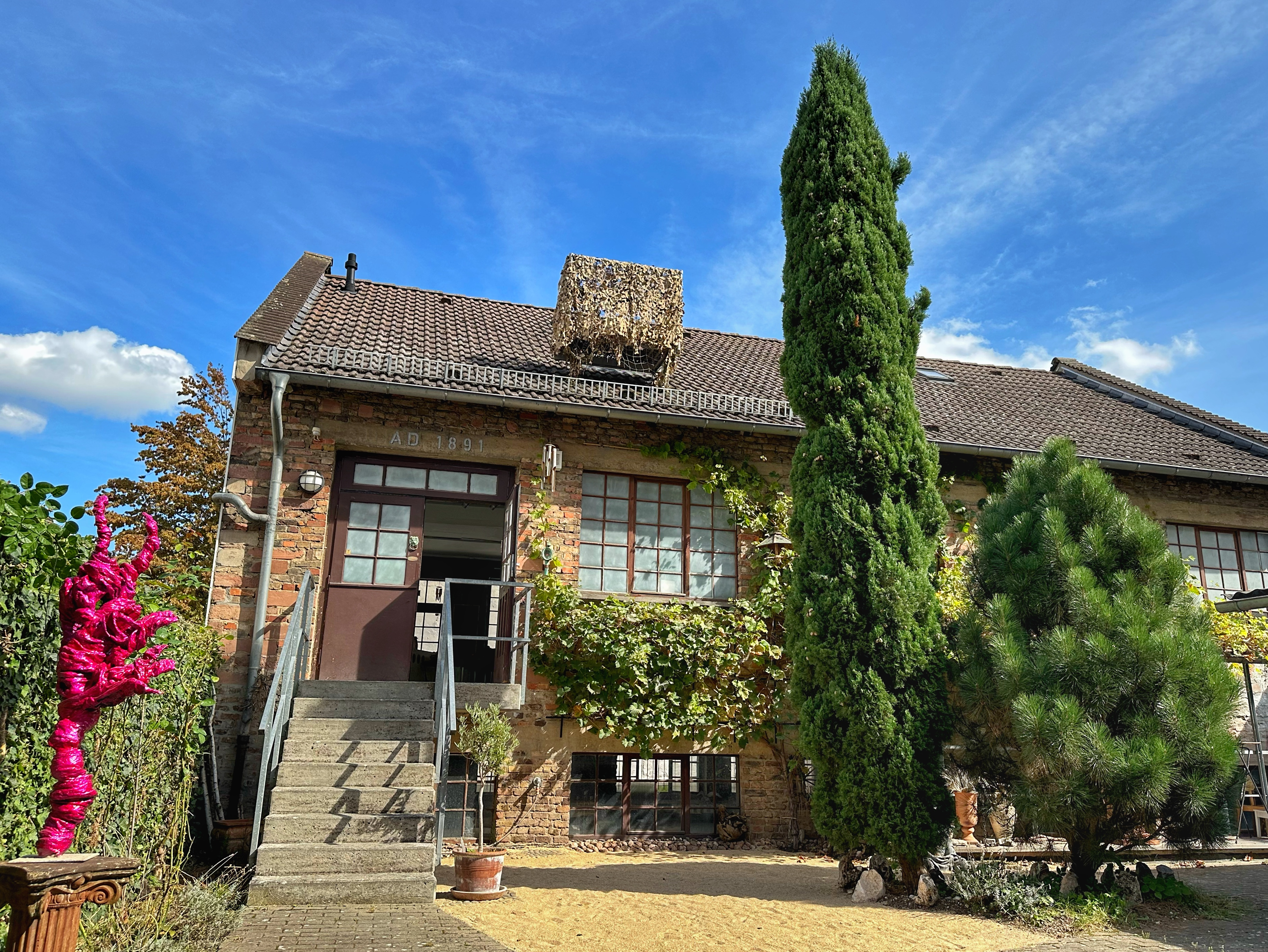
Talberg Museum

Ruben Talberg (born 24 August 1964, in Heidelberg) is a German contemporary artist, known as »King of Flow,« founder of the Neo-Fluxus art movement and Talberg Museum, a single-artist museum in Offenbach/Main, Germany.

== Work ==
In 1995, Talberg published his Neo-Fluxus Manifesto, codifying his philosophy of "flow" inspired by Heraclitus's »Pantha rhei« ("everything flows") and DAO (Taoism) principles. His signature »Manifolds« explore flow in various dichotomies such as nature versus alchemy, asymmetry versus dynamics, Eros versus Thanatos. In 2011, Talberg launched the Talberg Museum in Offenbach/Main, Germany, one of the few single-artist museums worldwide while the artist is still alive (List of single-artist museums).

According to Talberg's artist statement, his Neo-Fluxus Manifolds »express flow: manifestations of the eternal return of life and energy.«

Talberg lives and works between Heidelberg and Southern France.

== Bibliography (selected) ==
- 2026 Grow & Flow! / Talgrams, Talberg Museum
- 2025 Building Dreams & Talworx, Talberg Museum
- 2024, Holy Grail of Flow, Talberg Museum
- 23-24, 888 Manifolds, Talberg Museum
- 2023, Birth and Decay / Talgrams, Talberg Museum
- 2022, Documenta XV / Talgraphs, Indie solo show
- 2022, Myriorama of Flow, Talberg Museum
- 2021, Manifolds V / Talgraphs, Talberg Museum
- 2020, Manifolds IV / Talworx, Art Golani
- 2019, Neo-Fluxus / Talgraphs, Talberg Museum
- 2019, XL Manifolds / Talgrams, Art Golani
- 2018, Talworx & Manifolds", Talberg Museum
- 2017, Documenta XIV, Talberg Museum, Indie solo show
- 2017, Manifolds III / Talgrams, Art Golani
- 2016, Retrospective 2006-2016, AWG
- 2015, Prometheus / Talworx, Talberg Museum
- 2014, Arcanum / Talgraphs, Talberg Museum
- 2013, Talgrams & Talworx 84-13, Talberg Museum
- 2013, Arte Alchemica, Talberg Museum
- 2013, Visions of Voodoo, Talberg Museum
- 2012, Documenta XIII, Talberg Museum, Indie solo show
- 2012, Manifolds II / Talgrams, Art Golani
- 2012, Early works & Talworx, Talberg Museum
- 2012, Basquiat meets Talberg, Talberg Museum
- 2011, 111 Talgrams, Talberg Museum
- 2011, Abraxas, Talberg Museum
- 2010, Viridarium Chimicum, Talberg Factory
- 2010, INRI / Talgrams / Talgraphs, Talberg Factory
- 2010, Jacob's ladder, Talberg Factory
- 2010, Durchkämmung, Talberg Factory
- 2010, Nox / Talworx, Talberg Factory
- 2008, 400 Talgrams, Talberg Factory
- 2008, Damballah, Talberg Factory, ISBN 978-3-00-026230-2
- 2007, Documenta XII, Talberg Factory, Indie solo show
- 2007, Malchut / Talgrams, Talberg Factory, ISBN 978-3-00-023341-8
- 2007, Obsession, Salon Gallery, ISBN 978-0-9555408-0-6
- 2006, Eros & Thanatos, Villa Obsession, ISBN 978-3-00-020407-4
- 2002, Documenta XI, Villa Obsession, Indie solo show
- 2000, 300 Talgrams, Villa Obsession
- 2000, Talworx & Manifolds, Villa Obsession
- 2000, Alchemy, Villa Obsession, ISBN 978-3-00-021478-3
- 1997, Documenta X, Villa Obsession, Indie solo show
- 1995, Neo-Fluxus & Talgrams, Villa Obsession
- 1995, Asymmetry, Villa Obsession, ISBN 978-3-00-021477-6
- 1993, XS Manifolds / Talworx, Studio East-Side
- 1991, Anatomy of Evil, Studio East-Side, ISBN 978-3-00-021476-9
- 1990, Talgraphs 1977-1990, Studio East-Side
- 1986, Dionysian Dreams, Heidelberg
