= Van Gogh House (Drenthe) =

Museum in Drenthe in the Netherlands

- Van Gogh Huis
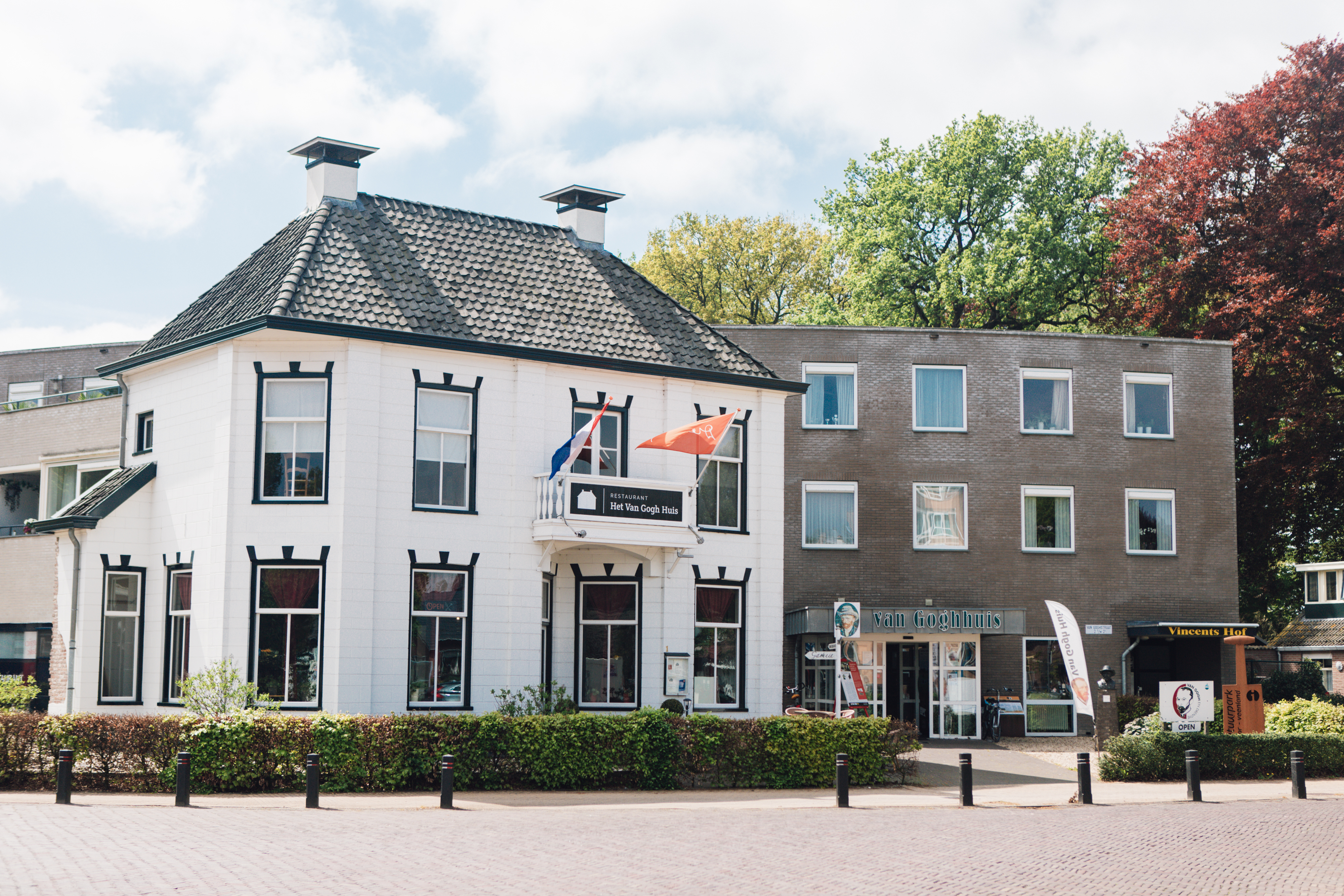
- The house in 2019
- Interactive map of Van Gogh House

General information
- Location: Van Goghstraat 1; 7844 NP Veenoord/Nieuw Amsterdam, Netherlands
- Coordinates: 52°42′57″N 6°50′59″E

Website
- https://www.vangogh-drenthe.nl/en/

Van Gogh House is a cultural site in Nieuw-Amsterdam, in the province of Drenthe in the Netherlands. The painter Vincent van Gogh stayed here for two months in 1883; the house is now a museum.

== History ==
=== Van Gogh in Drenthe ===
Vincent van Gogh lived in Drenthe for three months from September 1883. He arrived in Hoogeveen, from The Hague, by train on 11 September, and lived in a guest house there for about two weeks.

He travelled by canal boat to Nieuw-Amsterdam, and lodged in a room in this house from 2 October. He explored the area, and he drew and painted. He wrote many letters to his brother Theo in Paris.

On 4 December he returned to Hoogeveen, and from there travelled by train to Nuenen, his parents' home.

=== The house ===
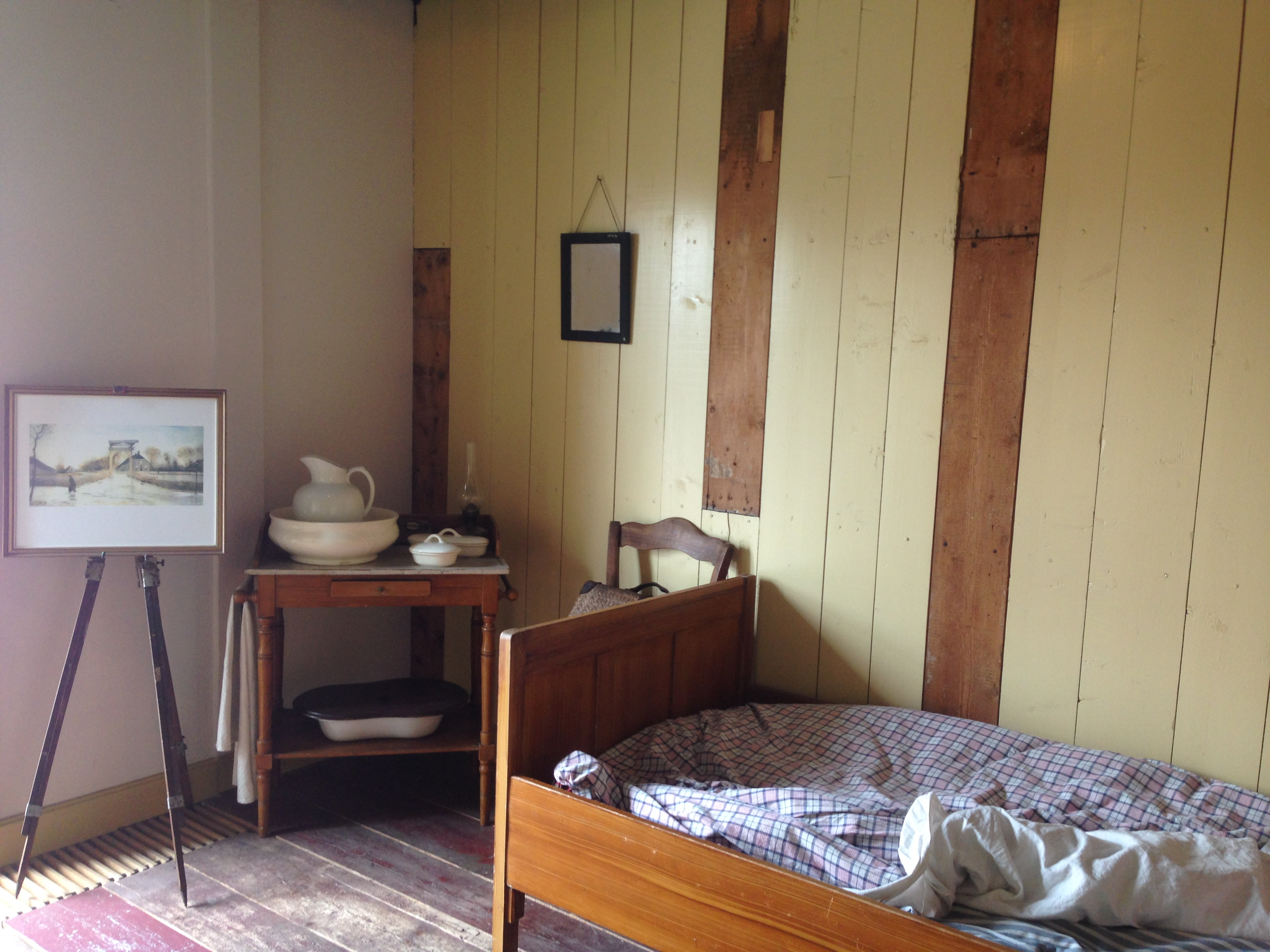
Van Gogh's room

The house was built in 1870 by J. A. Willinge Gratama, a lawyer in Assen. In 1876 he sold it to Hendrik Scholte: he was Van Gogh's host during the painter's stay in Nieuw-Amsterdam. In 1904 Scholte sold the house to his son-in-law Andries Mol, and others later owned the building.

In 1997 the Stichting Van Gogh & Drenthe (Van Gogh & Drenthe Foundation) began to plan its restoration, and the Van Gogh House was opened as a museum in March 2003. The room once occupied by Van Gogh is shown with furniture and his painting equipment, as it would have been during his stay.

== See also ==
- List of single-artist museums
- Van Gogh Museum
