= Liebermann Villa =

Art museum

Coordinates: 52°25′44″N 13°09′54″E

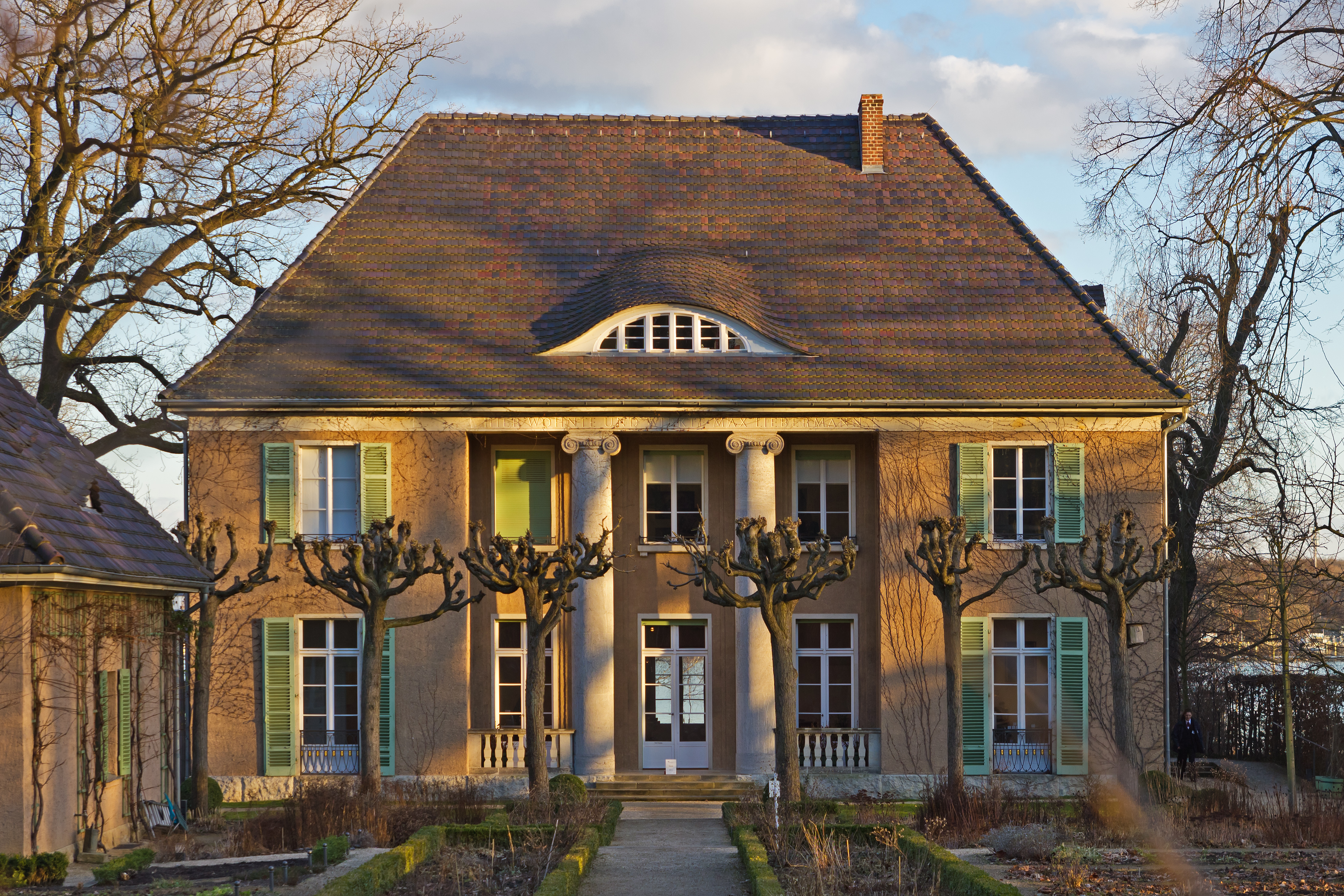
The Liebermann Villa

Liebermann Villa, Berlin

The Liebermann Villa is a museum located in the former summer residence of the German painter Max Liebermann. It is situated directly at the shores of Lake Wannsee in Berlin. It has been open to public since April 30, 2006 and shows a collection of Liebermann's paintings of his villa and its garden.

== History ==
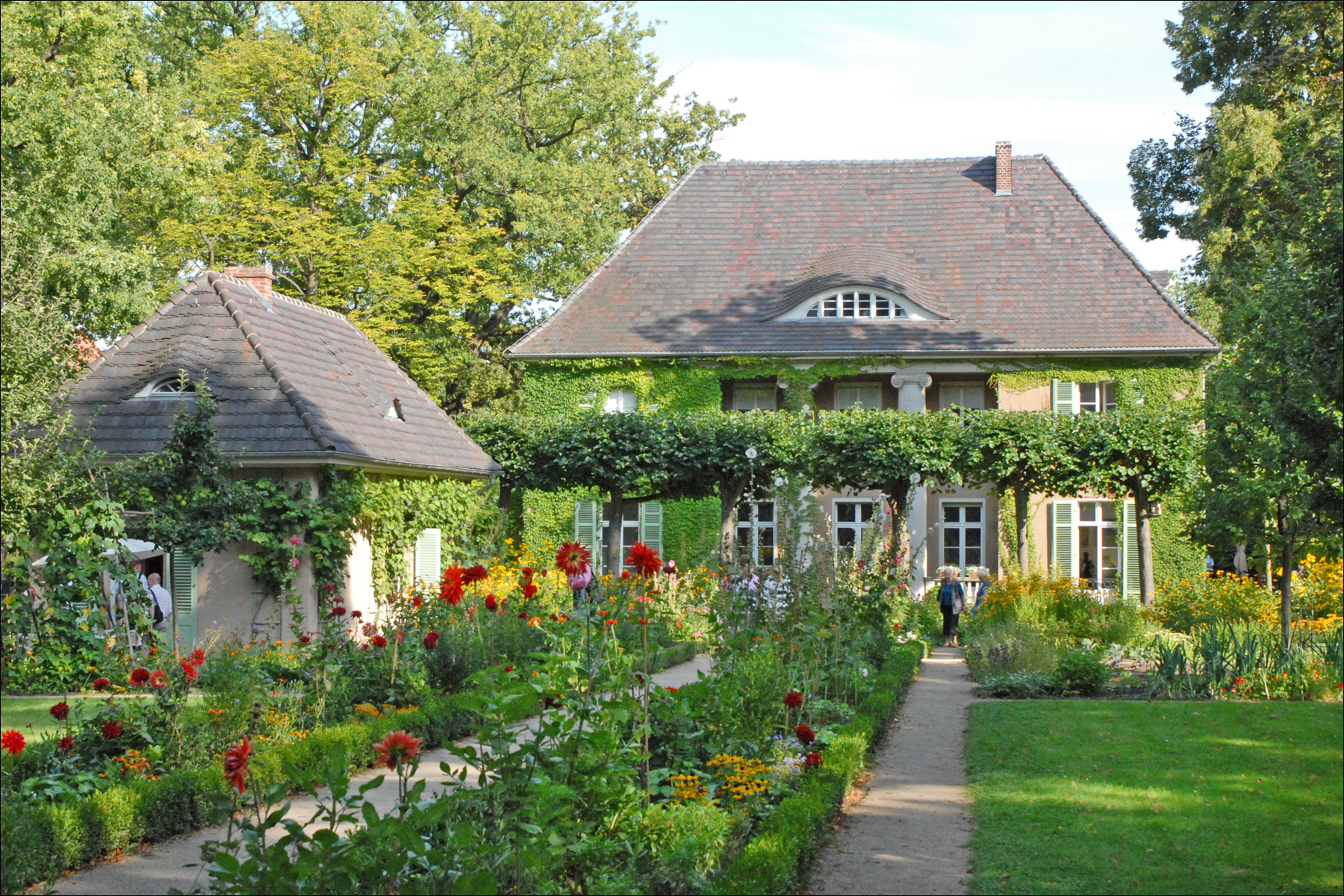
The Liebermann Villa in summer

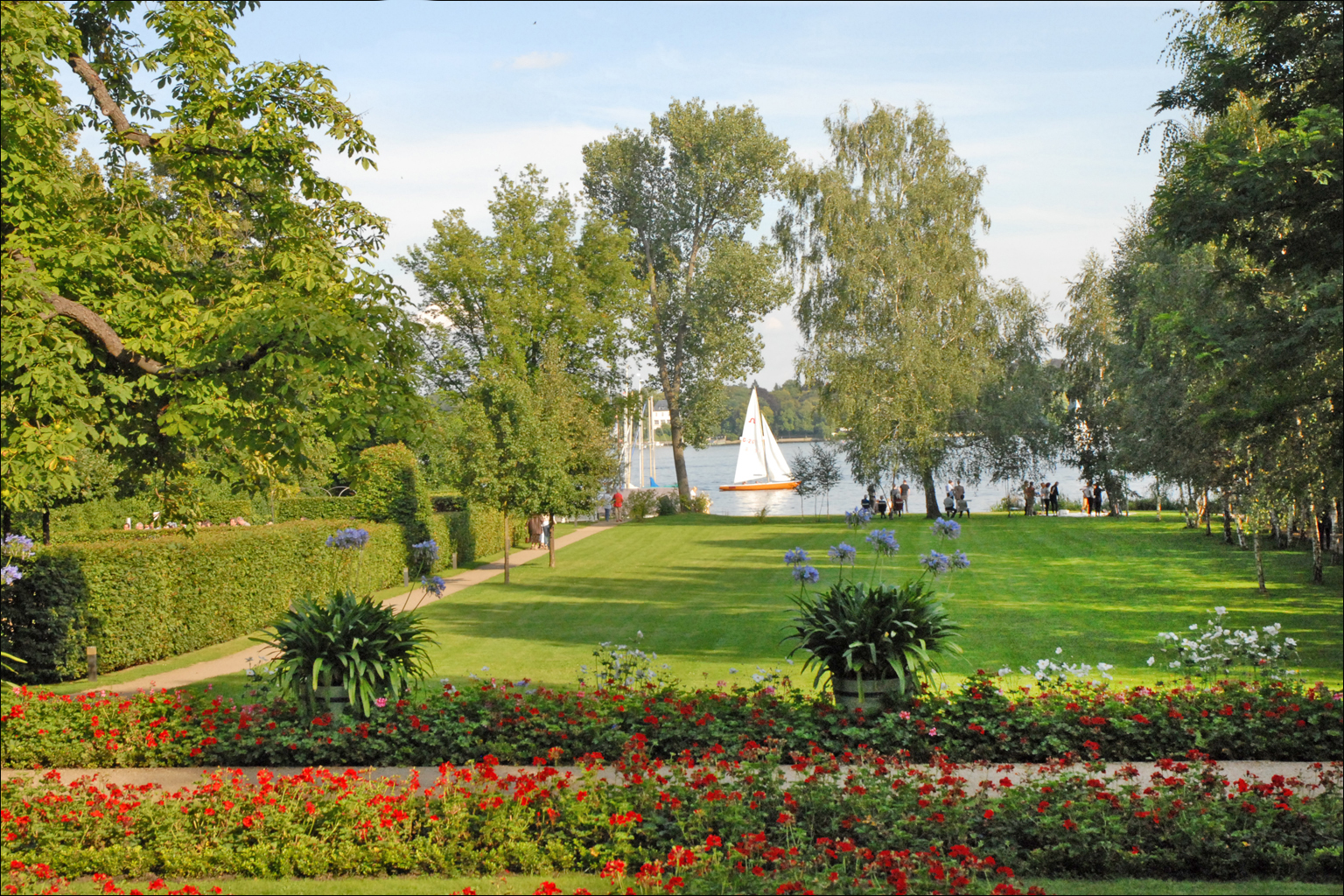
Garden looking out towards Wannsee

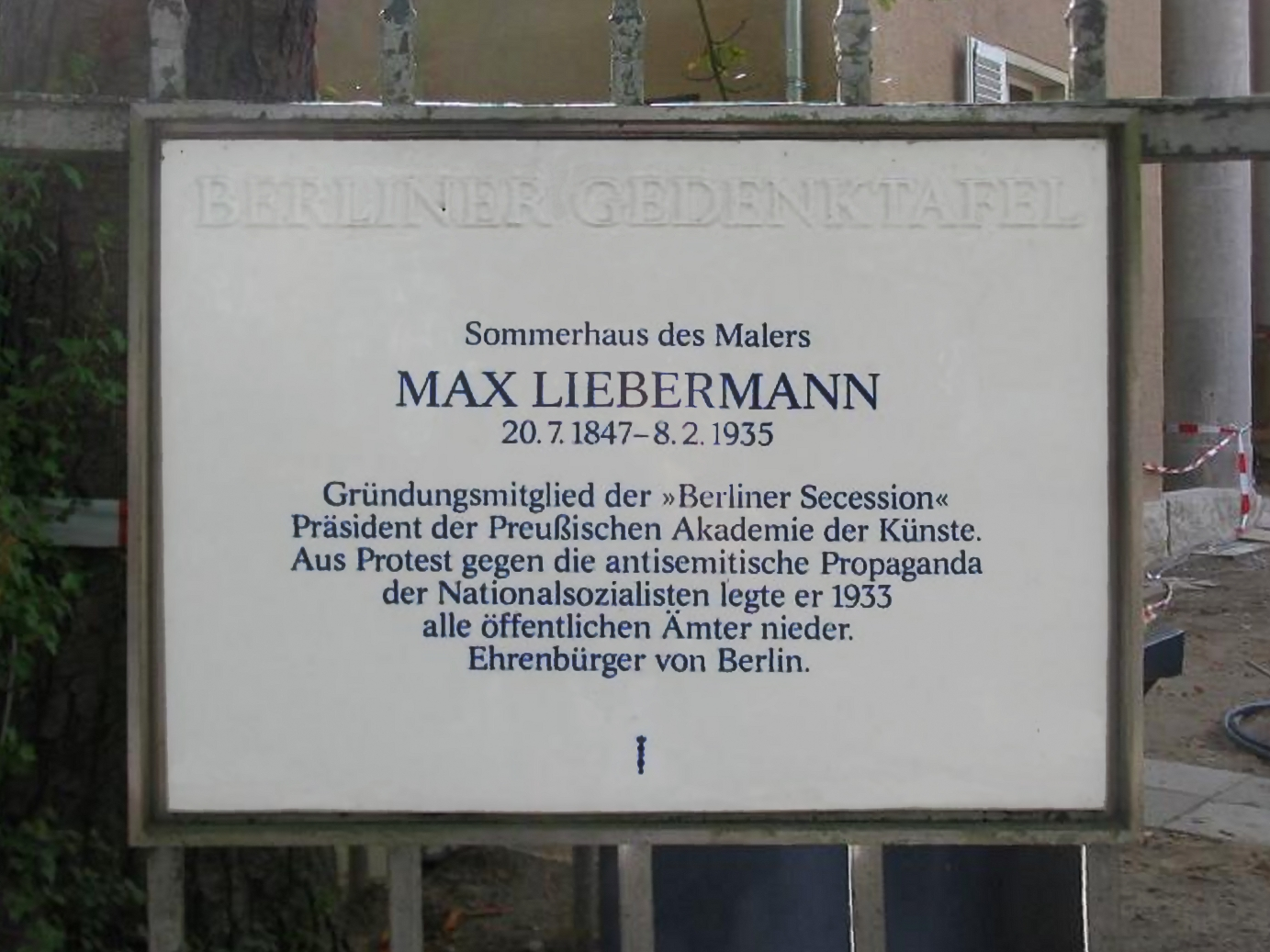
In memory of Liebermann at his Berlin villa

=== Max Liebermann ===
Max Liebermann (1847–1935) was co-founder and head of the Berlin Secession and head of the Prussian Academy of Arts (Preußische Akademie der Künste). He was dismissed by the Nazis in 1933 and banned because he was a Jew and a follower of what they considered to be degenerate art. He painted about 200 paintings of the garden at his villa, some of which are exhibited in his former studio on the upper floor.

=== Villa ===
In 1909, he bought a narrow piece of land with direct access to the shores of Lake Wannsee to escape from the city noise of Berlin. He lived there during the summer, from 1910 on. The villa was built by the architect Paul Otto Baumgarten. Liebermann called it his "little castle by the lake". It was completed in April, 1910.

=== Garden ===
The lengthy garden is divided in two by the villa itself. From the center of the villa, there is a view over the grass to Lake Wannsee. There is a garden terrace in front of the house, looking toward Wannsee. On one side of the grass, there is the famous birch path, with birch trees growing wherever they sprout. On the other side, there are three hedged gardens. In the rear of the villa, is the garden house and a vegetable plot.

== Museum ==
=== Permanent exhibition ===
In the former studio, on the upper floor, there are about 40 paintings related to the garden and the villa. On the ground floor, the history of the Liebermann family and the house is documented, including of how the Nazis forced Liebermann's wife, Martha, to sell the villa. The selling price was highly undervalued and in the end, she didn't even get that. Hours before she was due to be deported to Theresienstadt concentration camp, she committed suicide rather than risk death at the hands of the Nazis.

=== Museum's concept ===
The Max-Liebermann-Gesellschaft Berlin e. V. assists the museum in care of the villa and garden and in restoring them to their original state at the time of the Liebermanns' occupancy. Paintings of the garden and villa are presented continuously. A Multimedia Installation by Heiko Daxl and Ingeborg Fülepp opens a broader view with historical documents, photographs, sound recordings and films into the 100 years turbulent history of the house and the garden. Visitors can experience the serenity and spirit of the villa as Liebermann did when he lived and painted there.

== See also ==
- List of single-artist museums

== Bibliography ==
- Nina Nedelykov, Pedro Moreira (eds.): Zurück am Wannsee. Max Liebermanns Sommerhaus. Transit Buchverlag: Berlin 2003; ISBN 3-88747-181-4 (in German)
- Ingo Krüger, Landhäuser und Villen in Berlin & Potsdam - Nr. 3: Großer Wannsee, Colonie Alsen, Villa Liebermann. Delmenhorst: Aschenbeck & Holstein (2005) (in German)
