= Musée Nicolas Poussin =

Biographical museum in France

Coordinates: 49°14′44″N 1°25′14″E

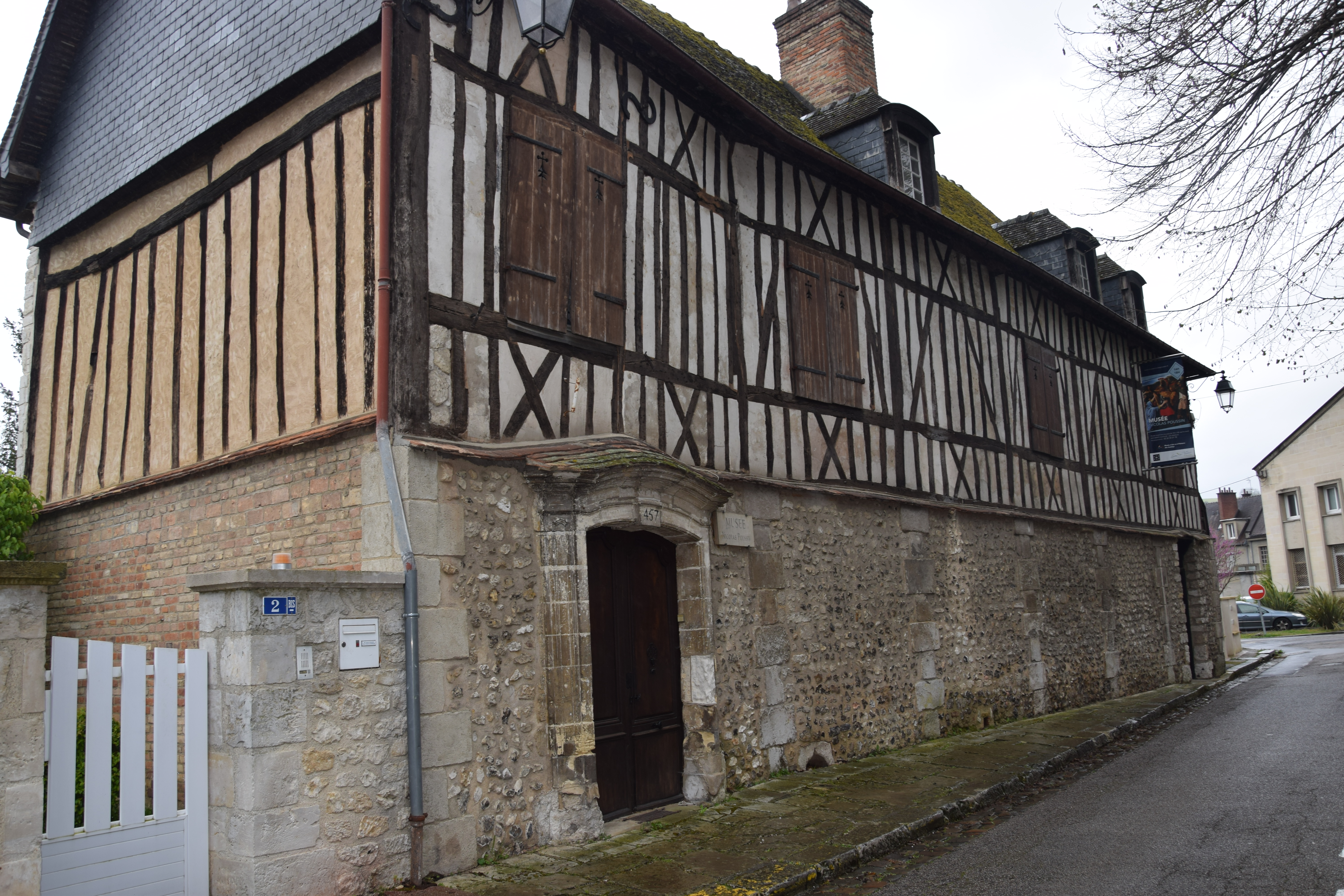
Musée Nicolas Poussin

The Musée Nicolas Poussin is a museum in Andelys in France. It is housed in an 18th-century house and named after the painter Nicolas Poussin, born in the hamlet of Villers, near Andelys, in 1594. Its collections include 18th-century furniture, religious objects, window glass, a 3rd-century Gallo-Roman mosaic, 19th- and 20th-century paintings and a painting of Coriolanus by Poussin himself.

== See also ==
- List of single-artist museums

== Sources ==
- Official Musée Nicolas Poussin website—(in French)
