= Drawbridge in Nieuw-Amsterdam =

Painting by Vincent van Gogh

Drawbridge in Nieuw Amsterdam (F1098)
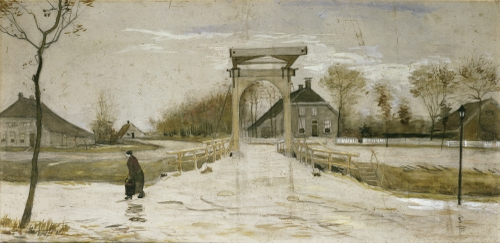
- Artist: Vincent van Gogh
- Year: 1883
- Type: Watercolor
- Location: Groninger Museum; Groningen, Netherlands (Note: In his 2006 edition of The Life and Work of Van Gogh, Nordenfalk states that the painting is owned by a collector. But, Frommer's identifies the painting as part of the Groninger Museum's collection in the passage about the museum.)

Drawbridge in Nieuw-Amsterdam is a watercolor created in November 1883 by Vincent van Gogh in Drenthe, The Netherlands.

== Watercolor painting ==
Van Gogh wrote to his brother, Theo, of the view outside his room in Nieuw-Amsterdam, Drenthe: "I now have a reasonably large room where a stove has been placed, where there happens to be a small balcony. From which I can even see the heath with the huts. I also look out on a very curious drawbridge." Within the letter he drew a sketch of the bridge, which became the watercolor, Drawbridge in Nieuw-Amsterdam.

The work was one of 148 watercolors made by Van Gogh, who said of working in that medium in 1881:

What a splendid thing watercolour is to express atmosphere and distance,
so that the figure is surrounded by air and can breathe in it, as it were.

Five years after having made this work, van Gogh made Langlois Bridge at Arles in France which captures a lighter mood.

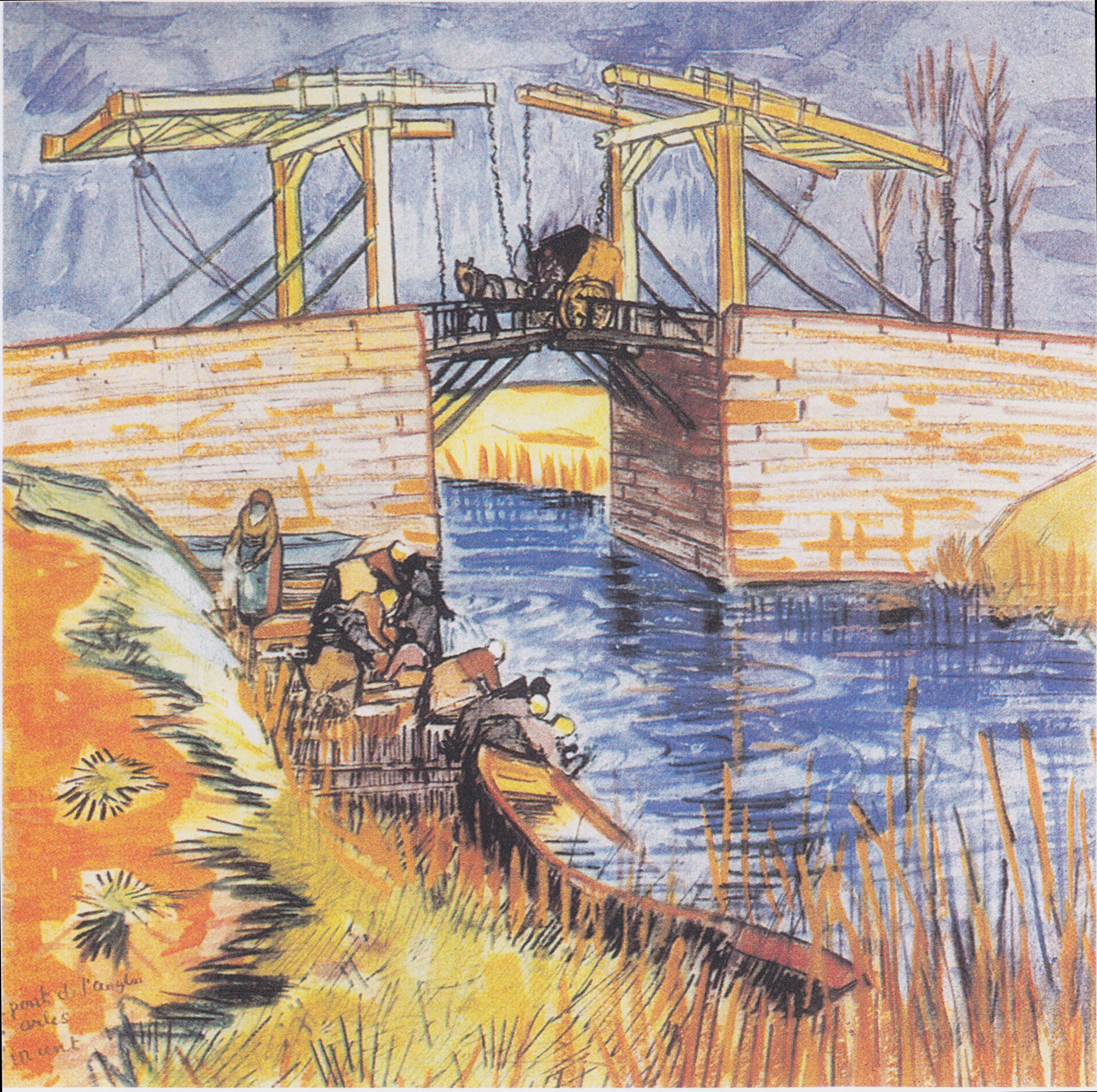
Langlois Bridge at Arles, watercolor, 1888, Private collection (F1480)

== See also ==
- Early works of Vincent van Gogh
- List of works by Vincent van Gogh
- Langlois Bridge at Arles (Van Gogh series)
