= Le Mayeur Museum =

Museum in Sanur, Bali, Indonesia

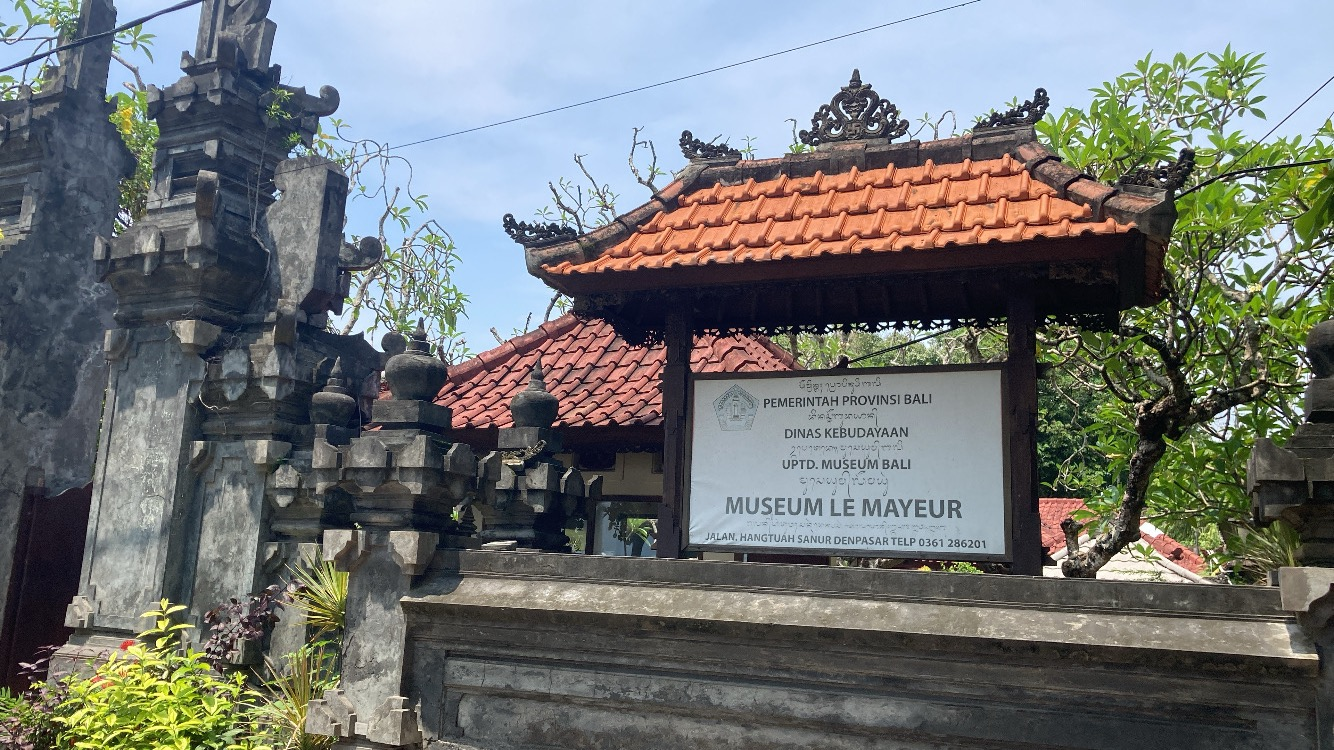
- entrance
- Established: 28 August 1957
- Location: Sanur, Bali, Indonesia
- Coordinates: 8.675010°S 115.263727°E
- Type: museum
- Key holdings: Adrien-Jean Le Mayeur
- Founders: Adrien-Jean Le Mayeur; Ni Pollok
- Website: ebooks.denpasartourism.com/en/museum-le-mayur/

The Le Mayeur Museum is a museum containing Adrien-Jean Le Mayeur's work as well as his collection of traditional Balinese art and local artifacts. It is located on the seafront at Sanur, Bali, Indonesia.

== Collection ==
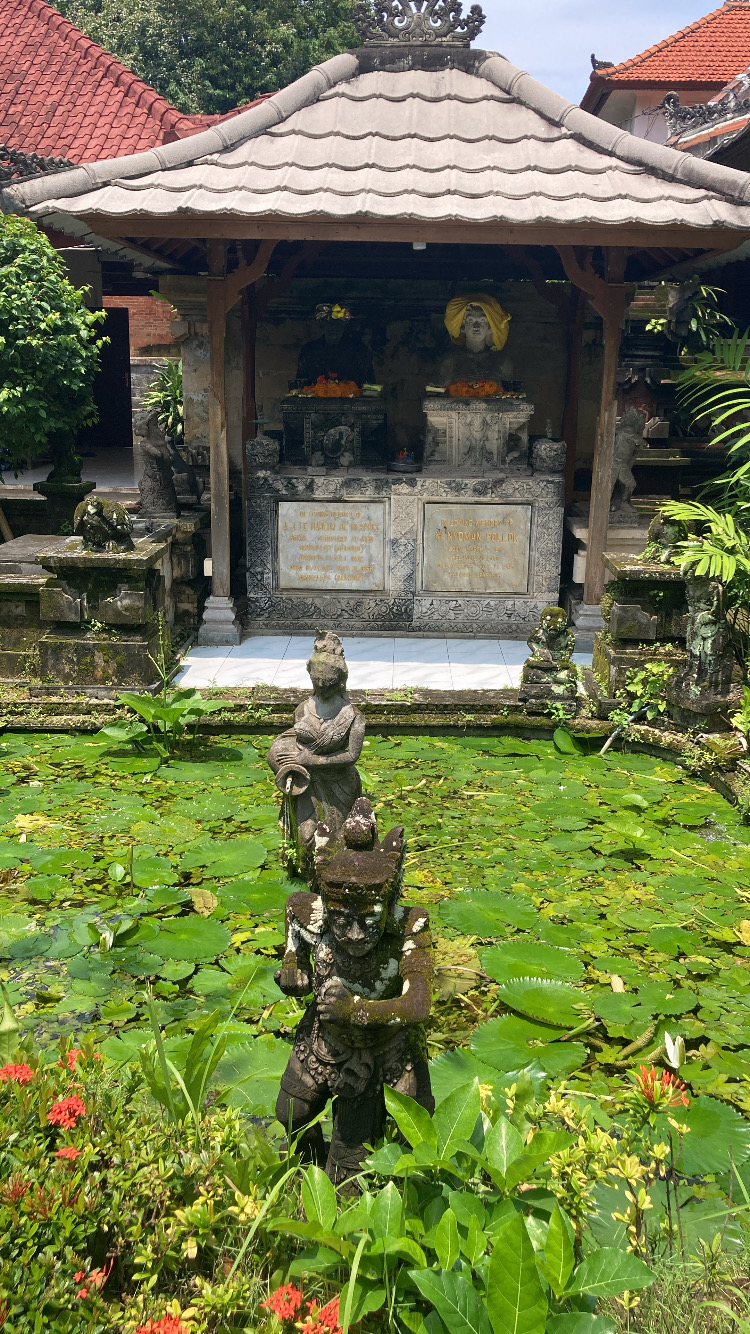
grave of Ni Pollok

Le Mayeur Museum displays paintings by Adrien-Jean Le Mayeur There are around 88 paintings: 28 oil on canvas paintings, 25 oil on board paintings. Some are labelled "repro".

== History ==
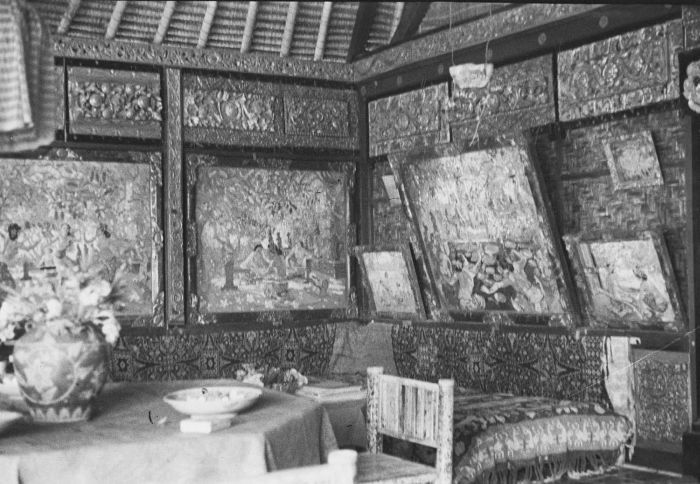
Interior of the house of Le Mayeur, 29 March 1949, today a museum

- Lenzi, Iola (2004). Museums of Southeast Asia. Singapore: Archipelago Press. p. 200 pages. ISBN 981-4068-96-9.

== See also ==
- List of single-artist museums
