= Clyfford Still Museum =

Art museum in Denver, Colorado, US

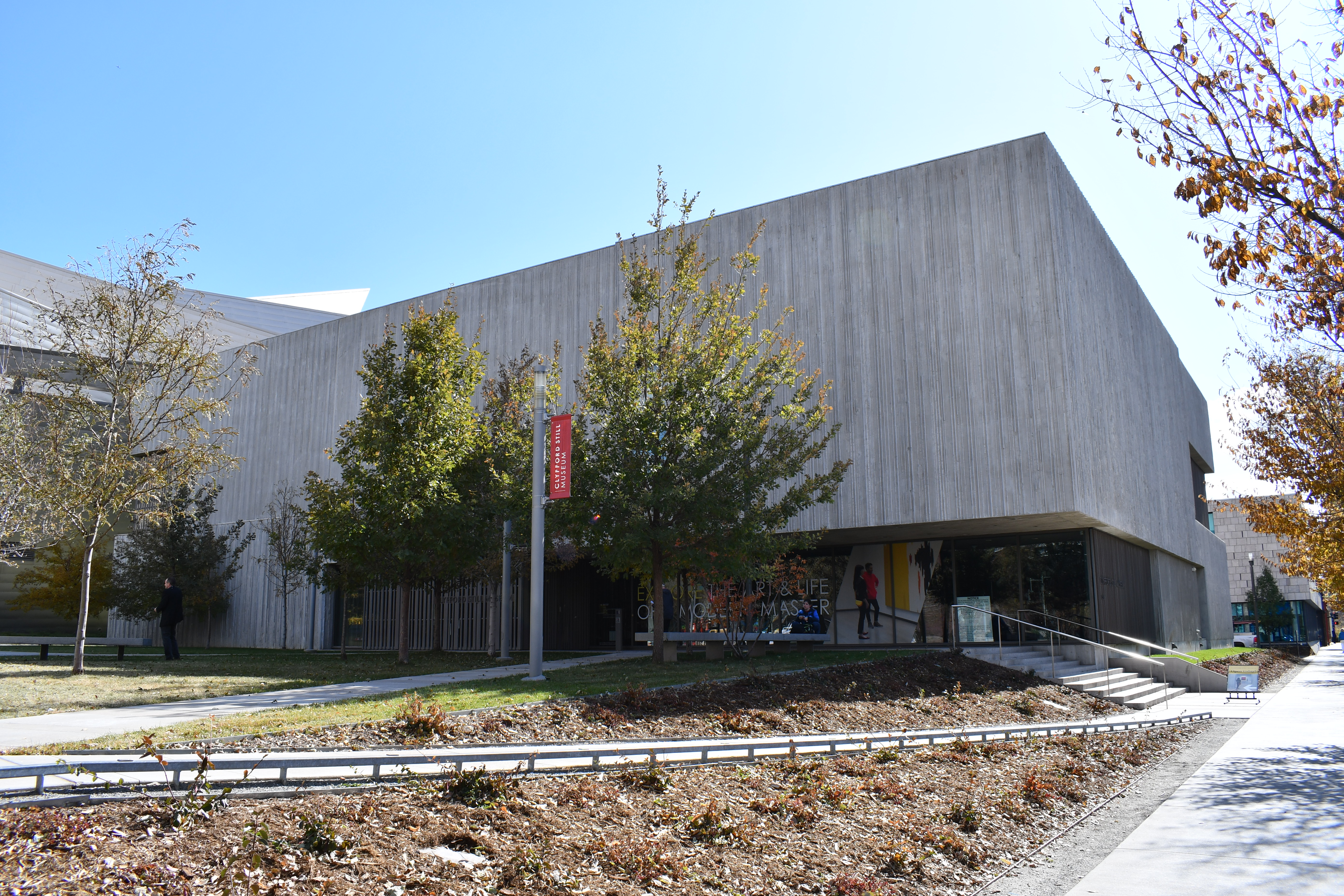
- Clyfford Still Museum exterior from Bannock Street
- Established: 2011
- Location: 1250 Bannock Street; Denver, Colorado
- Coordinates: 39.7363194°N 104.9919804°W
- Type: Art museum
- Website: www.clyffordstillmuseum.org

The Clyfford Still Museum is an art museum in Denver, Colorado. The museum's collection includes 3,125 works by abstract expressionist Clyfford Still (1904–1980), which represents 93 percent of the artist's lifetime output and complete archives.

The 28,500-square-foot building opened in 2011 and includes nine galleries, an art studio, visible painting storage areas and conservation lab, two outdoor terraces, archive displays, and outdoor forecourt green space. Its current director is Joyce Tsai.

== History ==
When Clyfford Still died in 1980, his will stipulated that his entire collection be given to an American city willing to establish a permanent museum dedicated exclusively to the care and display of his art. Approximately 20 American cities contended to receive the Still collection.

In August 2004, Still's widow, Patricia, chose Denver to receive the collection after then-Mayor John Hickenlooper visited her home and agreed to the will's terms. The artworks contained within the Clyfford Still Estate included roughly 825 paintings on canvas and 2,300 works on paper on various media including pastel, crayon, charcoal, gouache, tempera, graphite, and pen and ink, and fine art prints.

In 2006, the newly-formed Clyfford Still Museum secured a parcel of land within Denver's Civic Center Cultural Complex immediately west of the Denver Art Museum’s then-under-construction Frederic C. Hamilton Building, designed by Daniel Libeskind. Later that year, the board selected Allied Works Architecture, led by Brad Cloepfil, for the museum’s design. The museum broke ground on its new home in December 2009 and opened to the public on November 18, 2011 as a single-artist museum.

In 2017, the museum launched its first online collection and research database. In 2025, the museum launched an expanded online collection, Clyfford Still Online, which includes over 3,000 artworks that Still made during his lifetime and thousands of archival objects.

In 2024, the museum launched the Institute Residential Fellowship Program, by which it brings artists, educators, and thought leaders to Denver each summer to engage with the museum and its collections. The program is built on three pillars of study: art; education; and social enterprise. Past fellows have included artist Kevin Appel, early childhood scholar Kyong-Ah Kwon, enrolled member of the Colville Confederated Tribes Michael Holloman, Executive Director for the Paul Robeson House and Museum Riley Jones, IV and art writer Kealey Boyd.

== Art Collection ==
The Clyfford Still Museum art collection includes:

- 130 paintings from 1920–1943: works from Still’s student years, Depression-era works, Surrealist-inspired works, and first forays into abstraction
- 302 paintings from 1944–1960: Still’s “breakthrough period” and the years of “high” Abstract Expressionism
- 350 paintings from 1961 to 1979: works from the final two decades of his life, created in rural Maryland
- 2,300 works on paper spanning all aspects of Still's career in a wide range of media such as pastel, crayon, charcoal, gouache, tempera, graphite, and pen and ink, and fine art prints in a variety of techniques
- 3 carved wood and mixed media sculptures

== Exhibitions ==
The museum rotates the Clyfford Still Collection on average two to three times per year in themed exhibitions.

The museum's first exhibition was the Inaugural Exhibition. Other exhibitions include an Artists Select series curated by artists such as Katherine Simóne Reynolds, Roni Horn, Julian Schnabel, and Mark Bradford, Daughter's Eye/A Daughter's Voice curated by Sandra Still Campbell, and Repeat/Recreate with canvases from the Smithsonian American Art Museum, the Metropolitan Museum of Art, the Hirshhorn Museum and Sculpture Garden, the Modern Art Museum of Fort Worth, the Detroit Institute of Arts, the Museum of Modern Art in New York, and private collections. The Museum has also curated two exhibitions with young children, including Clyfford Still, Art, and the Young Mind in 2022 and “Tell Clyfford I Said ‘Hi’”: An Exhibition Curated by Children of the Colville Confederated Tribes in 2025.

The Clyfford Still Museum has also loaned out works for exhibitions in the past.

== Archives ==
The museum also houses the complete Clyfford Still Museum Archives of correspondence, sketchbooks, journals, notebooks, the artist's library, photo albums, personal effects, and other archival materials, inherited upon Patricia Still's death in 2005. Still corresponded with many artists, critics, dealers, museum professionals, and collectors of the Abstract Expressionist era such as Jackson Pollock, Mark Rothko, Clement Greenberg, and Peggy Guggenheim. The archives are open to the public online on Clyfford Still Online. The Archives' finding aids give an overview of the online archival holdings.

== Funding ==
The museum is run by a non-profit organization. A portion of the museum's funding is provided by a 0.1% sales tax levied in the Scientific and Cultural Facilities District (SCFD), which includes seven Colorado counties (Adams, Arapahoe, Boulder, Broomfield, Denver, Douglas and Jefferson) in the Denver-Aurora metropolitan area.

== Programs ==
The Clyfford Still Museum hosts monthly recurring programs including meditation, music performances, family artmaking workshops, and guided tours. The museum launched Art Crawl, a program for infants and their caregivers, in March 2022, and hosts three sessions each month in the galleries. The museum received a grant from the Institute of Museum and Library Services in 2023 to expand Art Crawl to locations outside the museum.

== Leadership ==
- Joyce Tsai, director (2021-present)
- Dean Sobel, founding director (2004-2020)
- David Anfam, senior consulting curator (2011-2020)
