= Cézanne's studio =

Biographical museum

- Atelier de Cézanne
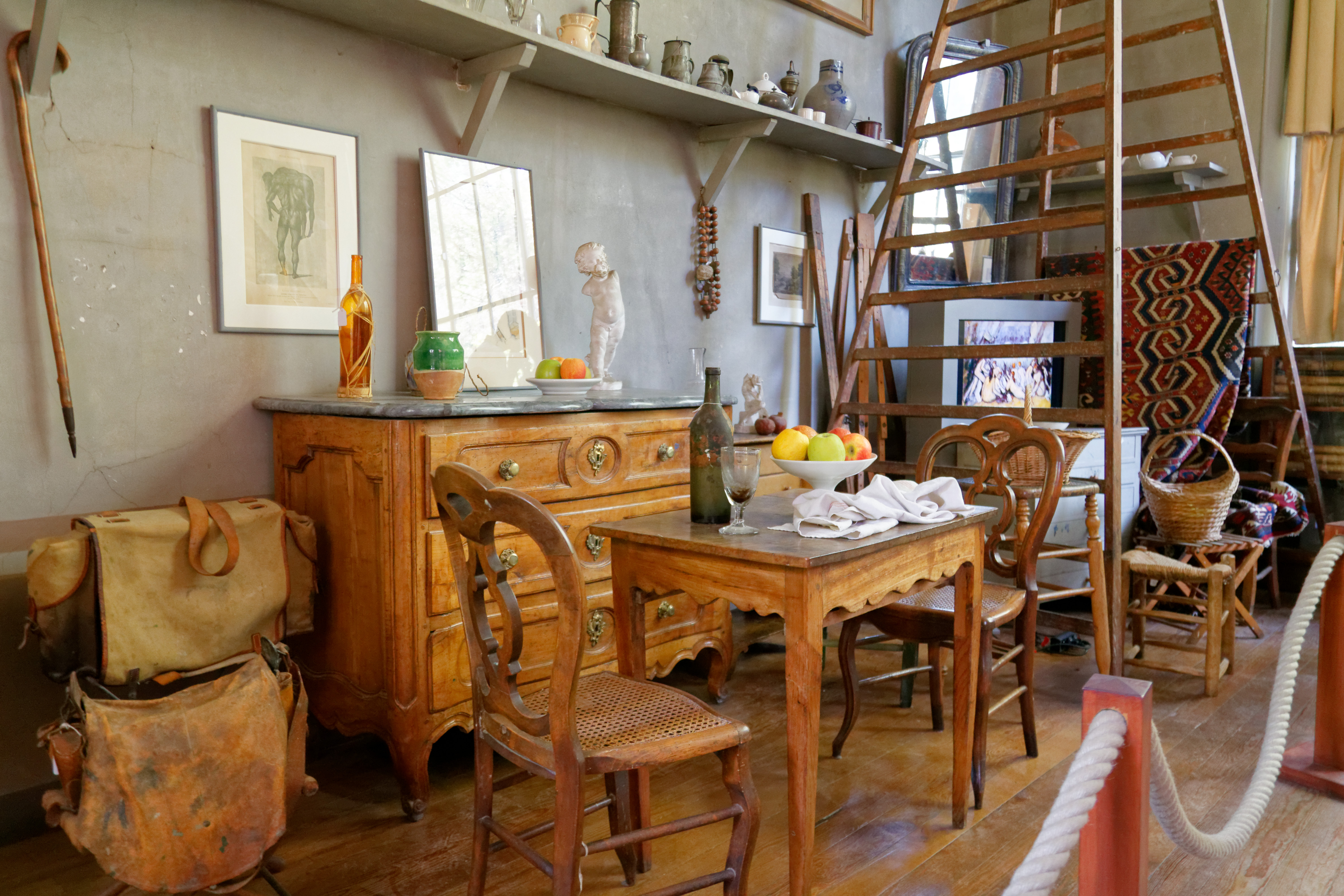
- The studio
- Established: 8 June 1954
- Location: 9, avenue Paul Cézanne; 13090 Aix-en-Provence, France
- Coordinates: 43°32′18″N 5°26′46″E
- Type: Biographical museum
- Owner: City of Aix-en-Provence
- Website: www.cezanne-en-provence.com/en/the-cezanne-sites/atelier-de-cezanne/

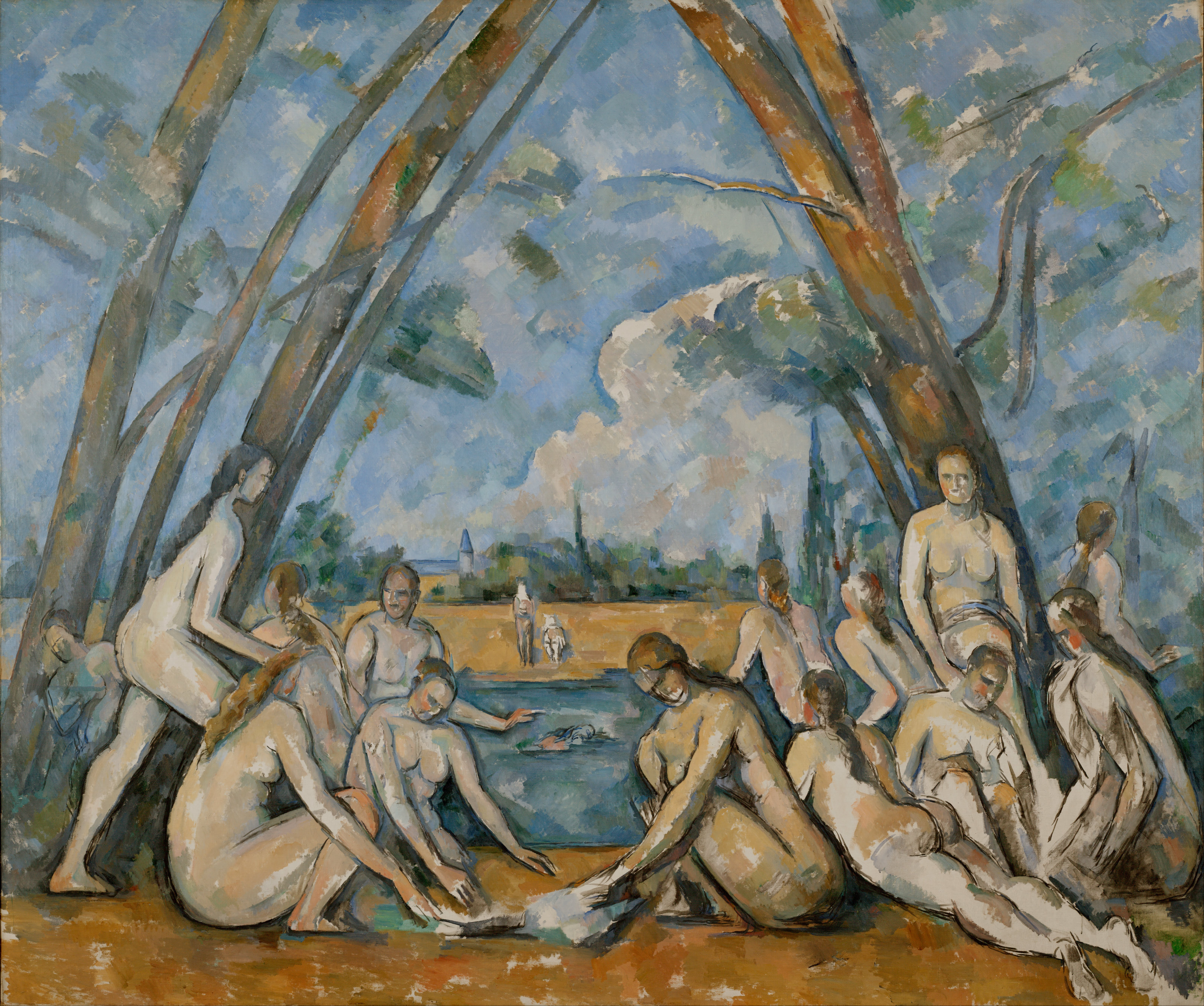
Paul Cézanne painted The Bathers in this studio

Cézanne's studio (Atelier de Cézanne) is a biographical museum about the painter Paul Cézanne, in Aix-en-Provence in Southern France. It was his studio from 1902 until his death in 1906. It was inaugurated as a house museum in 1954.

== Description ==
=== History ===
In November 1901, after the death of his mother and the sale of family property in Aix-en-Provence, Cézanne bought an old farmhouse and 7000 square metres of land on the Lauves hill near the city. It has a view of Montagne Sainte-Victoire, the subject of many oil paintings and watercolours by the artist.

He constructed a studio on the upper floor, lit by large windows on the south side and a glass roof to the north; it was completed in September 1902. The ground floor was used for daily life, and he worked in the studio, creating paintings including The Bathers.

After his death, it passed to his son Paul; it was bought in 1921 by Marcel Joannon (known as Marcel Provence), an admirer of Cézanne. He occupied only the ground floor, leaving the studio upstairs as Cézanne had left it. Artists and art historians, including John Rewald, came to visit. After Joannon's death, John Rewald and the writer James Lord established the Cézanne Memorial Committee; in 1952 the committee had enough funds to purchase the property, which was converted into a museum, on 8 June 1954.

=== Today ===
The building is now owned by the Tourist Office of Aix-en-Provence. In Cézanne's former studio there is his work equipment, the models of his final still life paintings and his furniture; there are some watercolours and drawings by the artist. Temporary exhibitions are held, and cultural events take place.

The building was given in 2012 the designation Maison des Illustres.

== See also ==
- List of single-artist museums
