= Otto-Dix-Haus =

Museum in Gera, Germany

Coordinates: 50°52′57″N 12°03′51″E

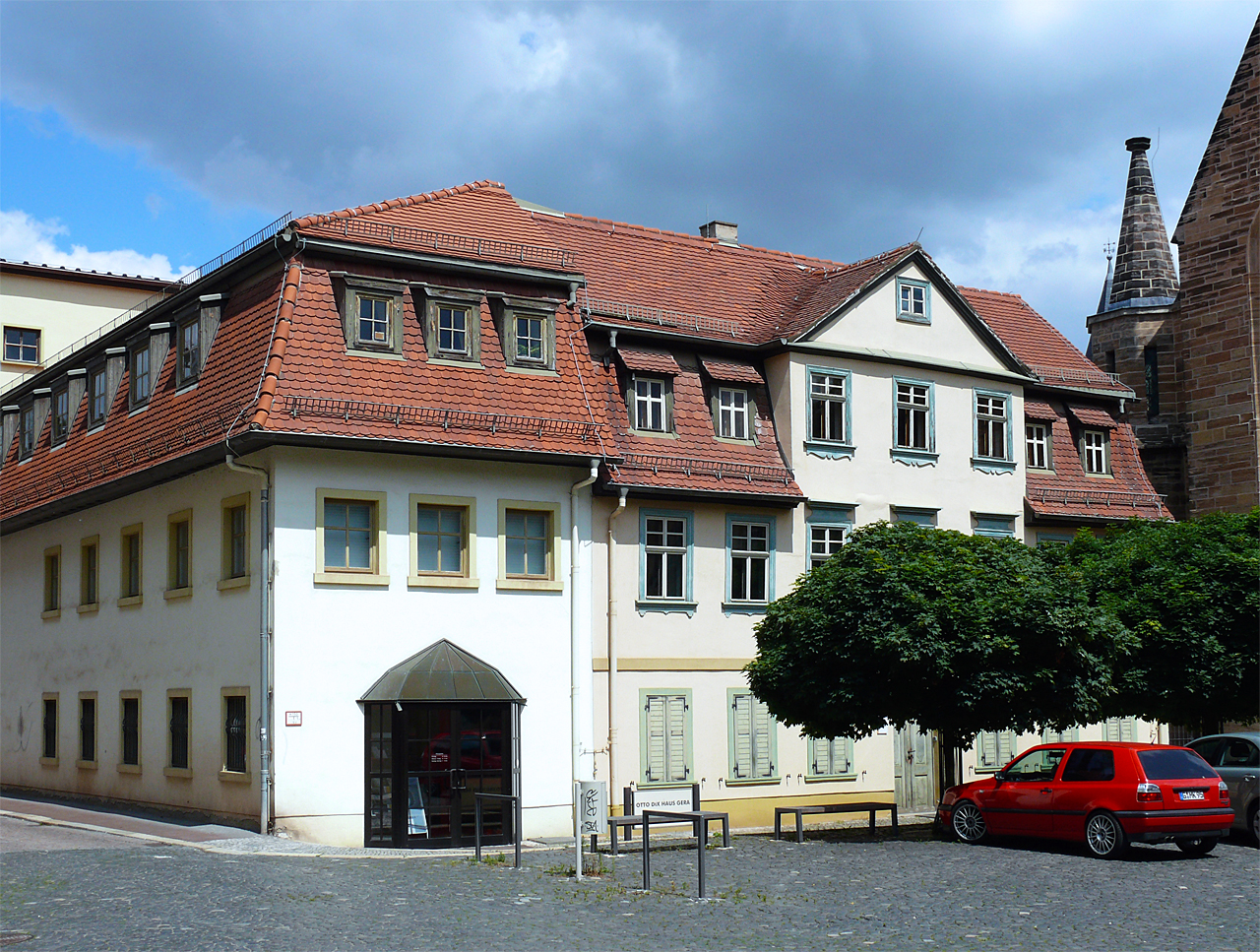
The Otto-Dix-Haus in Gera

The Otto-Dix-Haus or Otto Dix House in Gera is a museum located in the birth house of the German painter Otto Dix, at Mohrenplatz 4. The building became an art museum in 1991, with exhibits on two floors. for the celebrations of the 100th birthday of Otto Dix. The museum, with the Orangerie, is part of the Kunstsammlung Gera.

== Building history ==
The half-timbered building was built in the 18th century. In 1946 the rear building was converted for residential purposes. In the run-up to the 100th birthday of Otto Dix, who was born in the house on December 2, 1891, the building was converted into a museum from 1988 to 1991. For this purpose, an extension was built on the west side as an access and functional wing.

== Museum exhibition ==
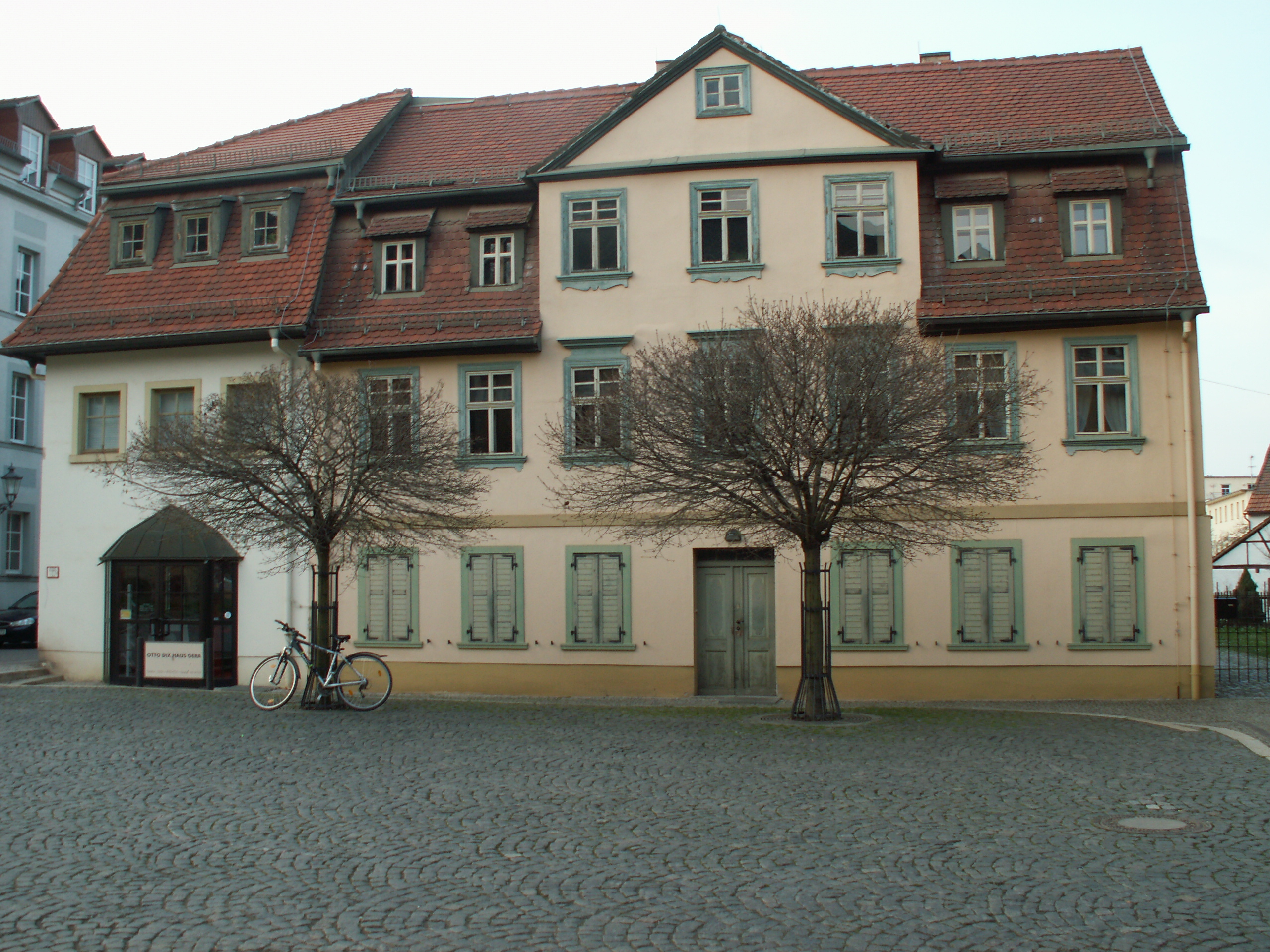
The Otto-Dix-Haus with the new extension located at the left

The museum evokes the atmosphere of a simple working-class house of the beginning of the 20th century and shows materials about the life and work of the artist. The museum's permanent exhibition includes 400 of his drawings and oil paintings, and printed graphics from its own holdings. In addition to works by Dix, which have a permanent place, there are also changing exhibitions of other loans. In addition to the works of Otto Dix himself, the museum regularly hosts exhibitions by other artists, including photo exhibitions, for which there is a separate exhibition hall. The rooms where Dix lived contain his work. The extensive collection of works on paper is displayed in alternating special exhibitions. After prior notice it is also possible to visit the study room and the collection of graphics of the house. The collection also includes the 48 postcards he sent during his service at World War I.

The paintings from several phases of the artist work exhibited in the museum include: Selbstbildnis als Raucher (1913), Meine Freundin Elis (1919), Doppelbildnis Otto Dix/Kurt Günther (1920), Der Heilige Christophorus IV (1939), and Bildnis des Malers Hans Theo Richter mit Frau Gisela (1933).

In addition to exhibition activities, the house-museum also runs educational courses for teachers and artists, including youth groups divided by age.

== Renovation ==
On 3 June 2013, the flooding of the White Elster River reached the ground floor of the museum. The flood damage made it necessary to renovate the building. The Otto-Dix-Haus therefore closed on 4 January 2016, and some exhibits were shown in an interim exhibition in the city museum. On Dix's 125th birthday, on 2 December 2016, the museum reopened with the special exhibition "Otto Dix: Drawing Art with Silver Pen".

== See also ==
- List of single-artist museums
