= Musée départemental Maurice-Denis =

Museum in Saint-Germain-en-Laye, France

Coordinates: 48.8927°N 2.0872°E

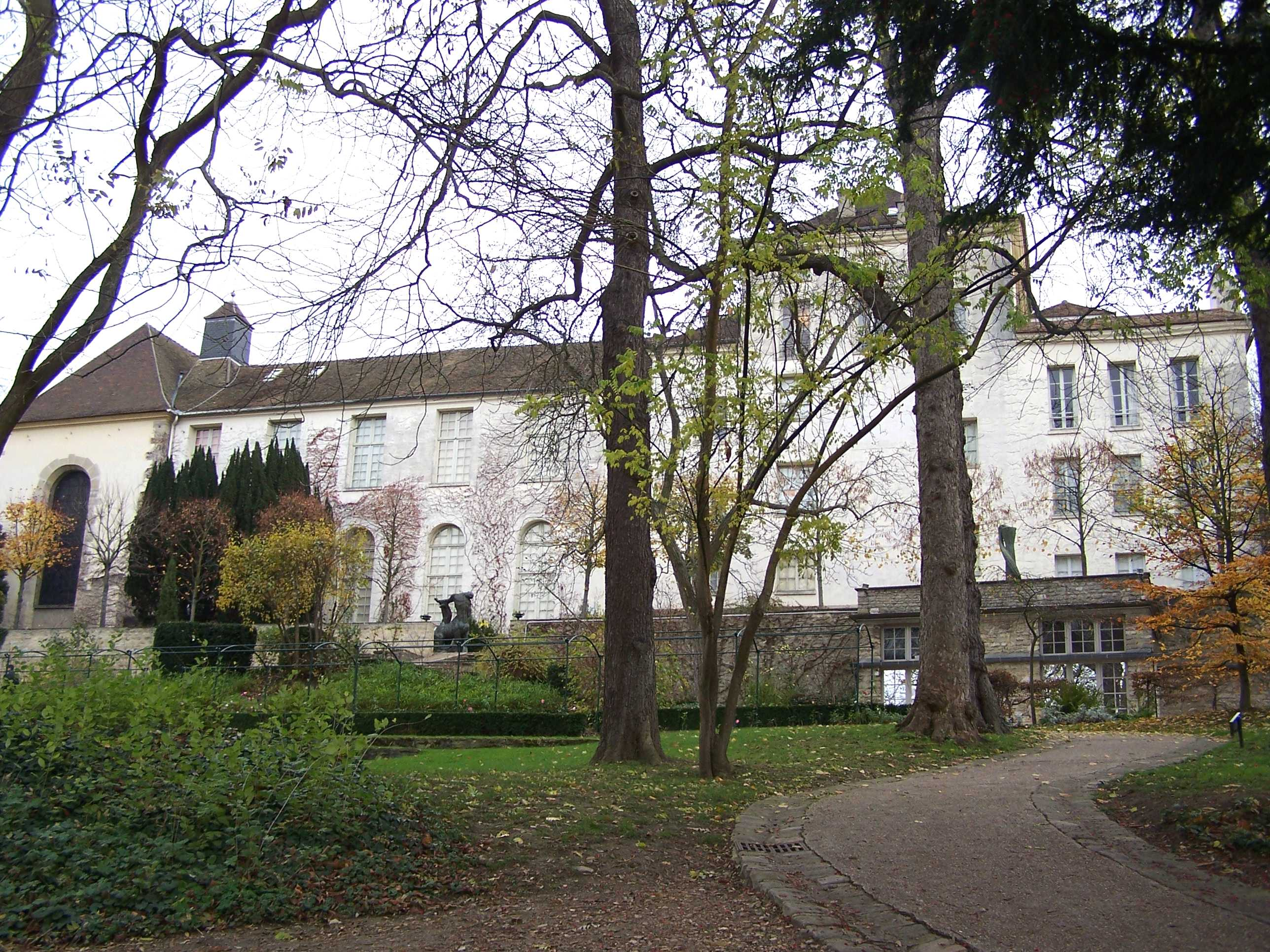
The Priory in a view from the garden

The Musée départemental Maurice Denis "The Priory" is a museum dedicated to Nabi art located in Saint-Germain-en-Laye, in the Parisian region (Île-de-France). The museum is dedicated to Maurice Denis, a French symbolist Nabi painter. The museum showcases his work as well as that of many other members of the school.

The Musée départemental Maurice Denis, or MDMD, was created in 1976 by the Conseil général of the Yvelines, the department in which it is located. The donation of both the priory and a large collection of Maurice Denis' family made the museum possible. It has been open to the public since 1980.

== History of the Priory ==
Maurice Denis rented the building and the grounds, an old royal general hospital dating to the 18th century and began to work there in 1910. He acquired it in 1914 and renamed it "the Priory" (Le Prieuré) after a neighboring street. He lived there until his death in 1943. Thereafter, the building was transformed into a school and treatment center for children suffering from neurological and psychological problems, a function it was to serve until 1973.

== Collection ==
The works from the Nabis and symbolist school present in the museum include those of Maurice Denis, Paul Gauguin, Paul Sérusier, Émile Bernard, Georges Lacombe, Paul Ranson, Odilon Redon, Pierre Bonnard, Édouard Vuillard, Félix Vallotton, Théo van Rysselberghe as well as sculptures by Gauguin, made in the Marquesas Islands.

One can also visit the ajoicent chapel, restored and decorated by Maurice Denis from 1915 and 1928, as well as his workshop, built in 1912 par the architect Auguste Perret. The whole is an imposing structure that includes a wooded park in the south. The building and its grounds were placed on the register of monuments historiques in February, 1976.

The association Amis du musée organises concerts and temporary exhibitions related to Symbolism and the Nabis.

== See also ==
- List of single-artist museums

== Footnotes ==
This article was originally translated from this version of its French equivalent.
