= Ernst Barlach House =

Art museum in Hamburg, Germany

Coordinates: 53°33′13″N 9°52′03″E

- Ernst-Barlach-Haus – Stiftung Hermann F. Reemtsma
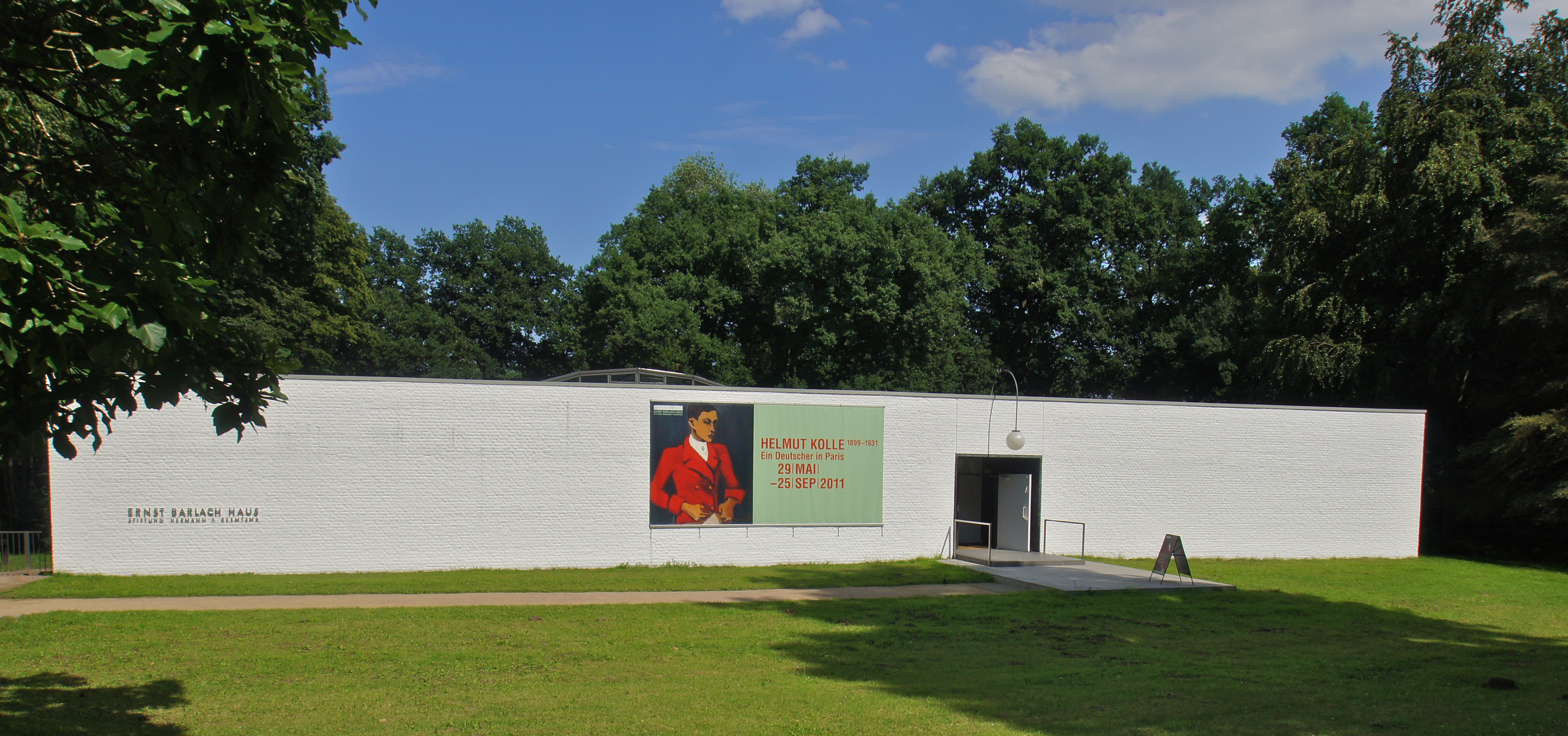
- Established: 1962
- Location: Germany
- Type: Art

Ernst Barlach House, Hamburg

The Ernst Barlach House – Hermann F. Reemtsma Foundation (German: Ernst-Barlach-Haus – Stiftung Hermann F. Reemtsma) is an art museum in Hamburg, Germany, devoted to the German Expressionist artist Ernst Barlach.

The museum was founded by the industrialist Hermann F. Reemtsma, and is located in the Jenisch park in Othmarschen in the west of the city. The squat, functionalist museum building was begun in 1961 by the Hamburg architect Werner Kallmorgen, finished in 1962 after Reemtsma's death, and extended in 1996 with new rooms for temporary exhibitions. There is also a library containing literature on Barlach and his era.

Reemtsma had begun to build a collection of Barlach's works in the mid-1930s, after first meeting the multi-talented draughtsman, graphic artist, sculptor and dramatist. Towards the end of the decade he sought to defend this collection as securely as possible against Fascist vandalism, after Barlach's cenotaphs in Kiel (Holy Ghost Church) and Güstrow (cathedral) were destroyed, 381 of his works were seized, and Barlach was classified as a "degenerate" artist and banned from working or being exhibited.

In the 1950s Reemtsma established the art foundation that bears his name, in order to preserve Barlach's works and make them accessible to the public. Shortly before his death in 1961 he commissioned the construction of the museum, which now states that its inventory has more than doubled since then and includes "around 140 works in wood, bronze, ceramics, porcelain, terracotta and plaster, more than 400 drawings from all his creative periods, almost all his printed graphics, as well as important autographs, rare portfolios, first editions and records".

== See also ==
- List of single-artist museums
