= Pius XII Museum =

Coordinates: 41.5484°N 8.4260°W

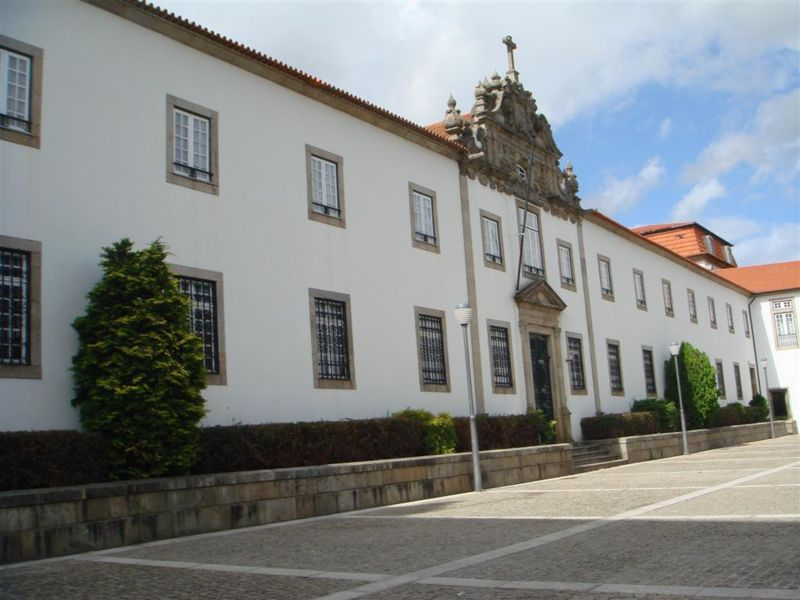
- Location: Braga, Portugal
- Type: History museum

The Pius XII Museum (in Portuguese: Museu Pio XII) is located in Braga, Portugal, in the same building of the Museum Medina, as the name from the Pope Pius XII.

The collection of the museum comprise Palaeolithic, Neolithic and Bronze Age implements, Pre-historic and Luso-Roman pottery.

In the museum is a Peristyle part of a Roman Villa in the original location.

== See also ==
- List of Jesuit sites
