= Medina Museum =

Museum in Portugal

Coordinates: 41.5483°N 8.4264°W

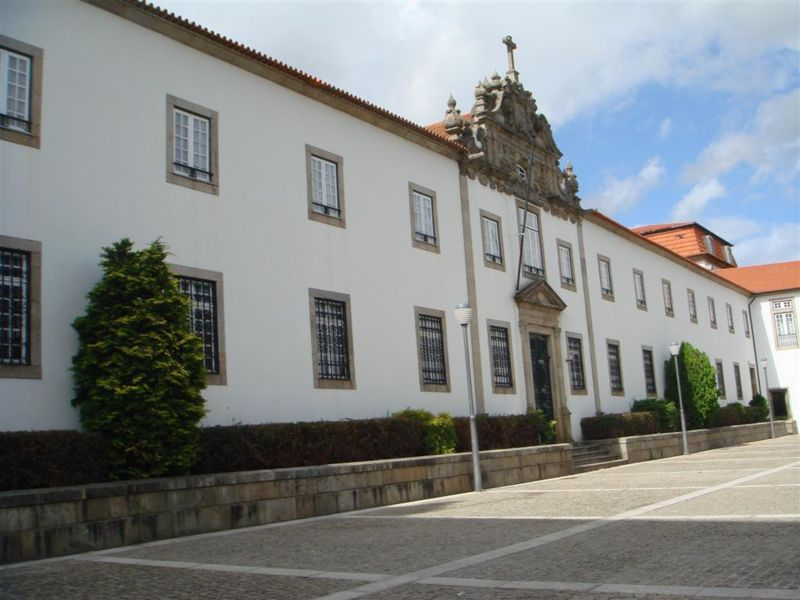
Medina Museum, in Braga

The Medina Museum is located in Braga, Portugal, in the same building of the Pius XII Museum.

The collection comprises 83 oil paintings and 21 drawings of the naturalist painter Henrique Medina. Among the collection there are many portraits, still life and landscapes.

The museum was inaugurated on 21 June 1984.

Henrique Medina (1901–1988) was born in Porto where he graduated in art. He also studied in Paris, Rome and London. His work is represented in many different museums in Portugal and other countries.

== See also ==
- List of Jesuit sites
- List of single-artist museums
