= Adrien-Jean Le Mayeur =

Belgian painter

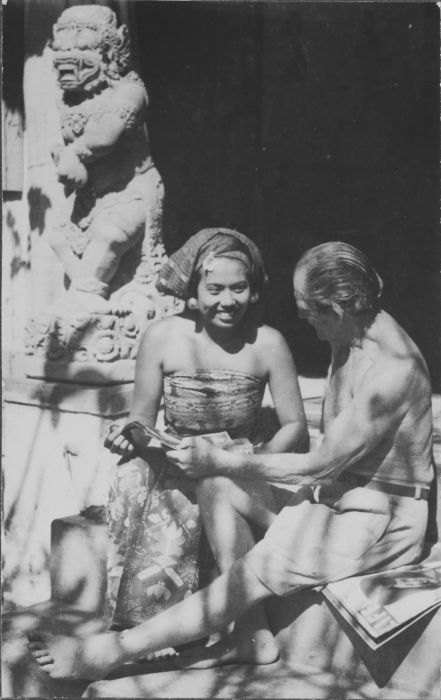
- Adrien Le Mayeur and his wife Ni Pollok
- Born: 9 February 1880
- Died: 31 May 1958 (aged 78); Belgium
- Resting place: Ixelles, Brussels
- Spouse: Ni Pollok
- Memorials: Museum Le Mayeur

Signature
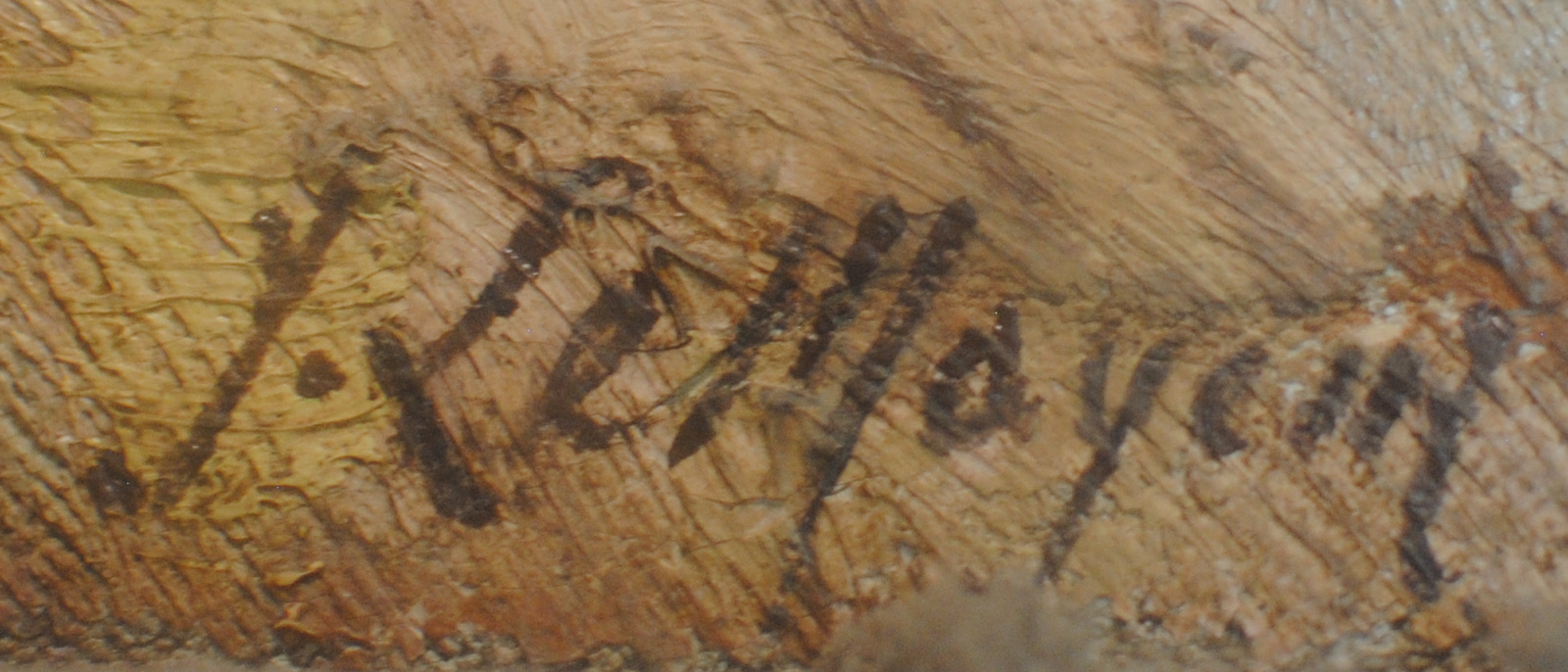

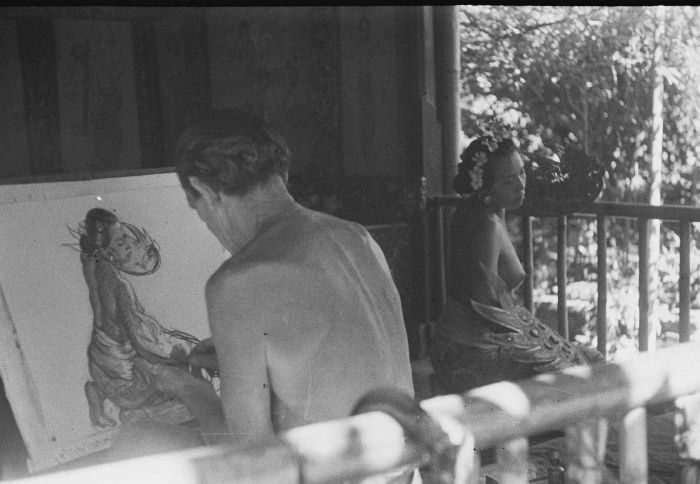
Ni Pollok posing for one of her husband's paintings

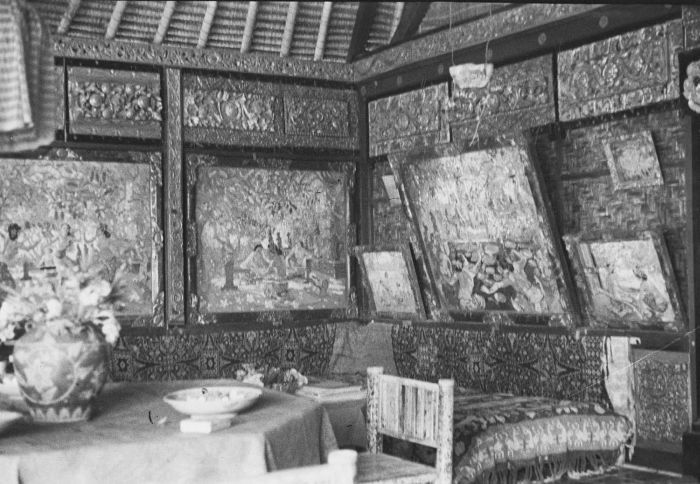
Interior of the house of Le Mayeur, today a museum

Adrien-Jean Le Mayeur de Merprès (9 February 1880 — 31 May 1958) was a Belgian painter from Ixelles who lived the latter part of his life in Bali.

== Biography ==
Le Mayeur came to Bali at Singaraja by boat in 1932. He then stayed in Denpasar and was fascinated by what remained then of Balinese culture, including the Balinese people's traditional way of life, the temple rituals and local dances. He was also impressed by the light, color and beauty of the surroundings in the then still quite unspoilt island.

Le Mayeur rented a house in banjar Kelandis, Denpasar, where he got acquainted with 15-year-old legong dancer, Ni Nyoman Pollok, known by her nickname Ni Pollok, who later on became Le Mayeur's model for his paintings.

A number of Le Mayeur's Bali works using Ni Pollok as model were exhibited in Singapore for the first time in 1933, which turned to be a very successful exhibition and made him more widely known. Returning from Singapore, Le Mayeur bought a piece of land at Sanur beach and built a house. At this house, which was also Le Mayeur's studio, Ni Pollok with her two friends worked every day as models. The beauty and splendid figure of Ni Pollok had made Le Mayeur enjoy his stay in Bali. At first he intended to stay only for 8 months, but later on he decided to stay in the island for the rest of his life.

After three years working together, in 1935, Le Mayeur and Pollok got married. Le Mayeur kept on painting with his wife as his model during their married life. During the Japanese occupation of the Dutch East Indies in World War II Le Mayeur was put under house arrest by the Japanese authorities. He continued painting, however, often painting on rice sack cloth and other surfaces he could find. After the war Le Mayeur's reputation grew at steady pace.

Years after the Proclamation of Indonesian Independence, Bahder Djohan, the Indonesian Minister for Education and Culture visited Le Mayeur and Ni Pollok at their house in 1956. He was greatly impressed with the painter's work and therefore suggested to the couple that their house and all its contents should be preserved as a museum. Le Mayeur agreed to the idea and since then he worked harder to add more collections to the house and to increase the quality of his works as well.

At last, Le Mayeur's dream came true that on 28 August 1957 a Deed of Conveyance Number 37 was signed, stating that Le Mayeur had given all his possessions including the land, his house with all its contents to Ni Pollok as a gift. And at the same moment, Ni Pollok then conveyed what she had inherited from her husband to the Government of Indonesia to be used as a museum.

In 1958 Le Mayeur had a severe ear cancer, and accompanied by Ni Pollok he returned to Belgium to have a medical treatment. After two months in Belgium, on 31 May 1958 the 78-year-old painter died and was buried in Ixelles, Brussels. Ni Pollok then returned home to take care of her house which had become the Le Mayeur Museum. She stayed there until her death on 18 July 1985 at the age of 68.

Le Mayeur and Ni Pollok's home is kept in its original condition and is still a museum where about 80 of Le Mayeur's works are exhibited, as well as his collection of traditional Balinese art and local artifacts.

== See also ==
- Balinese art
- Hinduism in Indonesia
- Balinese dance
