= Henrique Medina =

Portuguese painter (1901–1988)

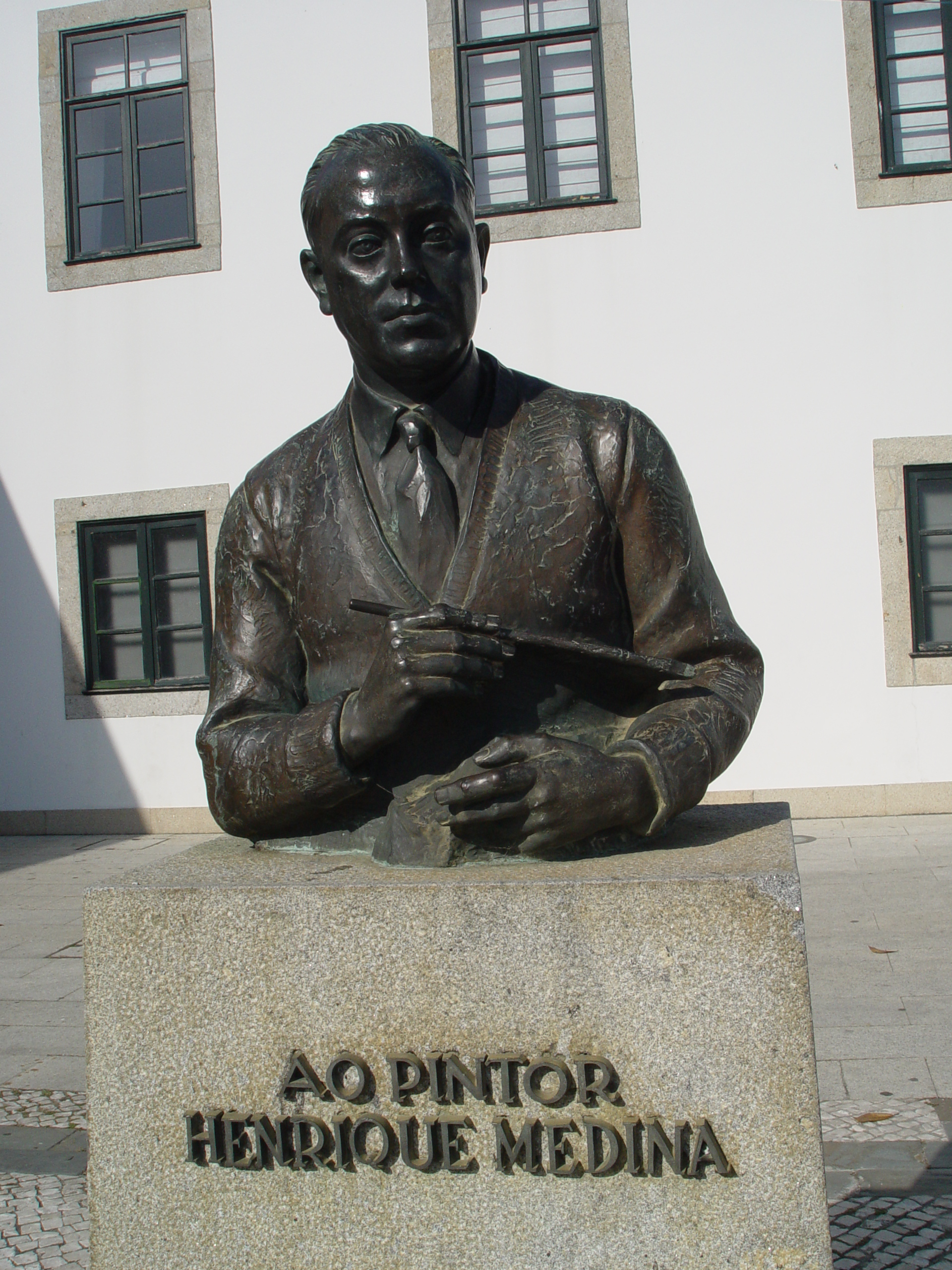
- Bust of Henrique Medina in Esposende
- Born: 18 August 1901; Porto, Portugal
- Died: 30 November 1988 (aged 87); Marinhas, Esposende, Portugal
- Known for: Painting
- Notable work: Media related to Henrique Medina at Wikimedia Commons

Henrique Medina de Barros (18 August 1901, in Porto – 30 November 1988) was a Portuguese painter, better known as a portraitist.

== Career ==
In 1919, he interrupted his studies in the Fine Arts School of Porto (Escola Superior de Belas Artes do Porto), and resumed his education in Paris, where Cormon and Bérard were among his teachers.

Medina was an academic painter during Modernism, and his subsequent career as a portraitist had an international reach.

He lived in London for ten years before arriving in Rome, where he painted Mussolini's portrait. He traveled to São Paulo, Buenos Aires, Madrid, came back to Paris and traveled to Stockholm. He eventually moved to the US. He lived in Hollywood, California for six years and painted actresses' portraits, and the painting of Dorian Gray in the MGM film The Picture of Dorian Gray (1945).

In his youth, Medina had spent vacations in his family's house in the suburbs of Marinhas, located in the municipality of Esposende. In 1974, at the age of 73, he returned to Esposende to live, paint portraits of rural life. Today, the secondary school of Esposende is named "Escola Secundária Henrique Medina" (Secondary School Henrique Medina) in his honour.

The largest collection of his works is in Braga, at the Medina Museum, and is composed of 50 oil paintings and drawings.
