= Nieuw-Amsterdam, Netherlands =

Village in the Dutch province of Drenthe

Nieuw-Amsterdam
- Village
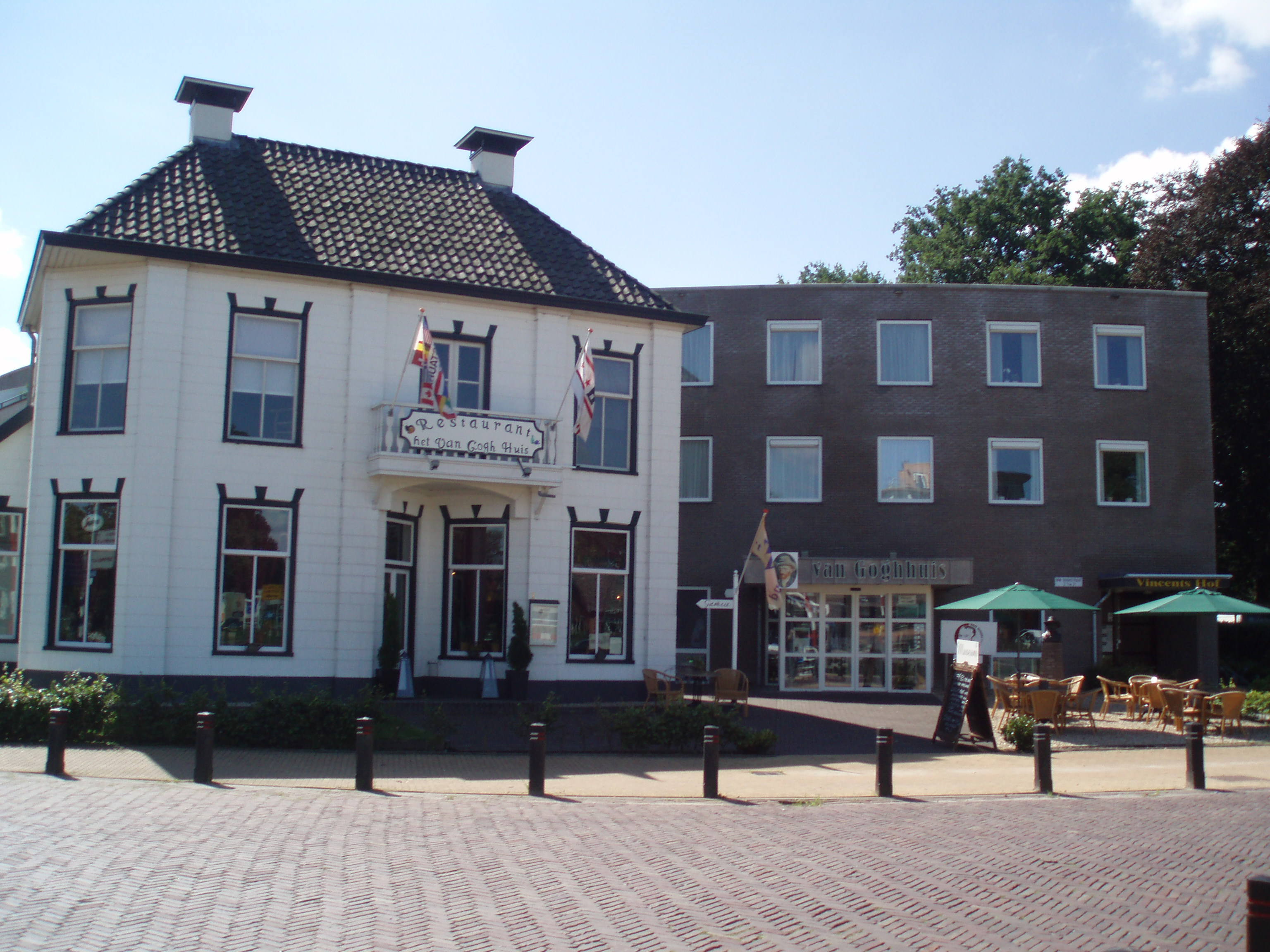
- Van Gogh House in Nieuw-Amsterdam

- Location in province of Drenthe in the Netherlands Nieuw-Amsterdam (Netherlands)
- Coordinates: 52°43′N 6°51′E
- Country: Netherlands
- Province: Drenthe
- Municipality: Emmen

Area
  - Total: 13.60 km^{2} (5.25 sq mi)
- Elevation: 15 m (49 ft)

Population (2021)
  - Total: 4,745
  - Density: 348.9/km^{2} (903.6/sq mi)
- Postal code: 7833
- Dialing code: 0591

Nieuw-Amsterdam (Dutch pronunciation: [ˌniu.ɑmstərˈdɑm]) is a village in the northeast Netherlands, in the Dutch province of Drenthe. It borders the village of Veenoord, the twin village of Nieuw-Amsterdam. Since 1998 Nieuw-Amsterdam and Veenoord are part of the municipality of Emmen.

== History ==
In 1850, a group of investors from Amsterdam bought a tract of peatland and named it after their own city: Amsterdamscheveld ("field of Amsterdam"). A settlement that was built near these lands several years later was called Nieuw-Amsterdam.

The settlement developed itself quickly because of the peat trade. Drenthe therefore acquired the nickname Drents California, which likened the peat to gold. Important for the development of the village was that it is situated along the canal called the Verlengde Hoogeveensevaart.

The "Hervormde kerk" was erected in 1873 by the architect H. C. Winters. The "Gereformeerde kerk" with its paraboloidal roof was built in 1925, based on the design by architect W. van Straten. The names of both churches can be translated into English as "Reformed Church"

=== Vincent van Gogh ===
Most of the time Vincent van Gogh spent in Drenthe, in autumn 1883, he lodged with Scholte in Nieuw-Amsterdam. Today, Scholte's lodging house is known as the Van Gogh House (Van Gogh Huis). Recently, the municipality of Emmen planned to demolish the building, but at the last moment this decision was reversed. Today, it houses a restaurant and a museum.

The Drawbridge in Nieuw-Amsterdam is probably the most popular work Van Gogh executed during his stay in Nieuw-Amsterdam.

Even more popular is the oral tradition concerning Van Gogh at whatever place he stayed for a while. Thus, in Nieuw-Amsterdam he is said to have paid the rent with his paintings, but the landlord could not estimate their value and burnt them.

== Transportation ==
Railway station: Nieuw Amsterdam

The village is located at the train track from Zwolle to Emmen. This track was opened in 1905 and was constructed by the Noordoosterlocaalspoorweg-Maatschappij (NOLS). Before the train, Nieuw-Amsterdam already had two steam tram connections: the Dedemsvaartsche Stoomtramweg-Maatschappij (DSM) station was opened in 1899 and the Eerste Drentsche Stoomtramweg-Maatschappij (EDS) station in 1903.

== Notable people ==
- Bas Sibum (born 1982), footballer
