= Single-artist museum =

Museum dedicated to one artist

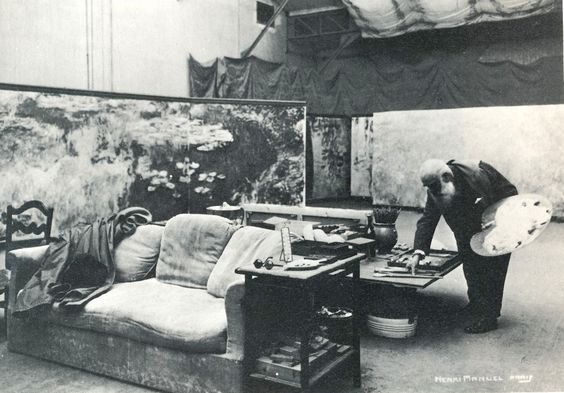
Claude Monet in his large studio at his home in Giverny, France

A single-artist museum features the life and work of one artist and can be a private or public entity. It can be established during the artist's lifetime or after the artist's death.

== Home and studio single-artist museums ==
Home and studio single artist museums expand on the historic tradition of preserving European artist's studios. The Fondation Monet Giverny in France, where Monet lived and worked from 1883 until his death in 1926, maintains and shares with the public his famous gardens, home, studio and some of his masterpieces. Home and studio single artist museums "can take on the character of a pilgrimage site, whether that's due to the intense focus of its collections or to circumstances that grant an artist's ephemera the status of relics."

The Frida Kahlo Museum, where Frido Kahlo was born, and lived and worked, was inaugurated as a single artist museum in 1958 and displays artwork by Kahlo as well as documents, books and more. It "exhibits the ambience that inspired Frida for her creation, as well as her personal belongings."

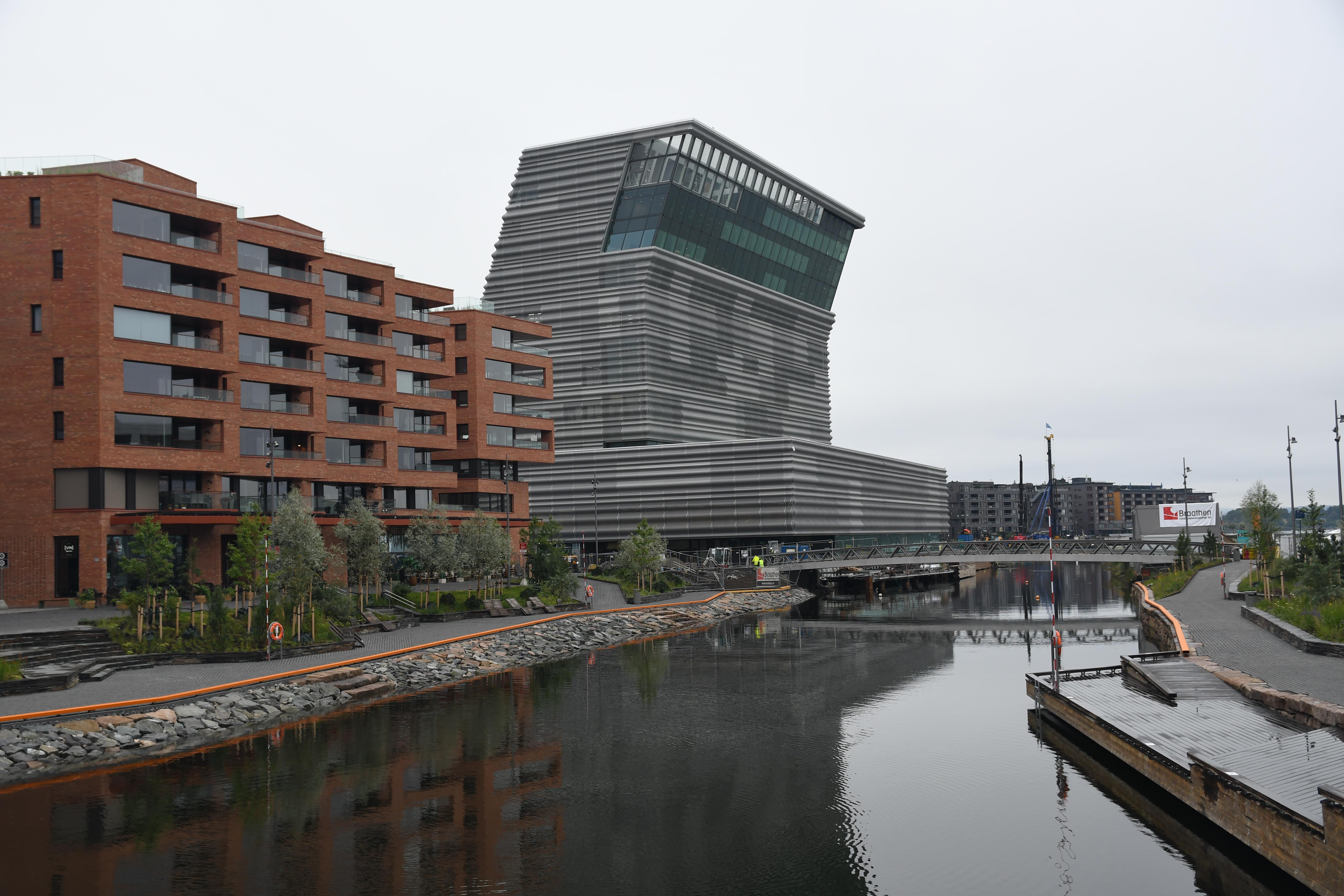
Munch Museum (shown right), Oslo, Norway

== Purpose-built single-artist museums ==
In 2021, the City of Oslo, where Edvard Munch lived and worked, opened a purpose-built museum on the waterfront dedicated to the creator of the infamous painting The Scream. It was a hundred years after Edvard Munch bequeathed his works to Oslo and initiated discussions about a future museum, that the architectural firm Estudio Herreros designed MUNCH in Bjorvika. At 26,313 meters (more than 280,000 square feet) the new MUNCH is one of the world's largest museums devoted to a single artist.

There are several museums dedicated to the 20th century artist Salvador Dalí. The Salvador Dalí Museum that opened in St. Petersburg, Florida, in 2011, was designed by architect Yang Weymouth. It features more than 2400 works collected by A. Reynolds and Eleanor Morse and others, as well as gardens, and a center for avant-garde research.
