= 1982 in art =

Events from the year 1982 in art.

== Events ==
- June 26 – The Paul Delvaux Museum in Saint-Idesbald, Belgium, is inaugurated with Paul Delvaux present.
- July 22 – An 1847 bronze casting of a statue of politician William Huskisson by John Gibson is removed by night from its original plinth in Liverpool (England) by activists because of the subject's support for the slave trade.
- May 23 – Cartoonist Gerald Scarfe's animations play a major part in the success of the film version of Pink Floyd's The Wall, released today.
- December 28 – Snow v Eaton Centre Ltd decided: the Ontario High Court of Justice affirms the artist's right to integrity of his work.
- Andy Warhol "falls in love" with Duran Duran at a Blondie concert.
- Photographer Jacqueline Livingston opens Jacqueline Livingston "A One Artist Gallery" in New York's Soho showing a different body of her work monthly for one year. Livingston and her gallery are placed under FBI surveillance because of accusations of child pornography.

== Awards ==
- Archibald Prize: Eric Smith – Peter Sculthorpe
- John Moores Painting Prize - John Hoyland for "Broken Bride 13.6.82"
- John Player Portrait Award: Humphrey Ocean

== Films ==
- 66 Scenes from America

== Works ==
=== Paintings ===
- Michael Andrews – Sax AD 832
- Avigdor Arikha – Marie-Catherine
- Wolf Kahn – My Barn on a Summer Night, Hirshhorn Museum
- Mary Lovelace O'Neal - It Takes Three (to do it) (from the Whales Fucking seria c. 1981-82)
- Henry Moore – The Artist's Hands I (charcoal, wax crayon and ballpoint pen)
- Malcolm Morley - Cradle of Civilization with American Woman
- Euan Uglow – Zagi
- Art Fills the Void

=== Other ===
- Arman - Long Term Parkingn (Accumulation of 60 Automobiles in Concrete) installed at the Château de Montcel in Jouy-en-Josas, France
- Joseph Beuys – 7000 Oaks – City Forestation Instead of City Administration at Documenta 7, Kassel
- Daniel Buren – "Les Guirlandes" (The Garlands at Documenta 7, Kassel
- John Seward Johnson II – Double Check (sculpture in New York City)
- Joan Miró and Joan Gardy Artigas – Dona i Ocell (tiled sculpture in Barcelona)
- Pan He – Zhuhai Fisher Girl (sculpture)
- Jean Tinguely and Niki de Saint-Phalle – Fontaine des automates, Paris

== Births ==
- October 20 – Adela Jušić, contemporary visual artist from Bosnia and Herzegovina
- December 10 – Zuzana Čížková, Czech painter and sculptor
- December 16 – Justin Mentell, American artist and actor (d. 2010)
- María Berrío, Colombian-born graphic artist
- Tris Vonna-Michell, British installation artist
- Approximate date – Bambi, English graffiti artist

== Deaths ==
- January 17 – Juan O'Gorman, Mexican painter and architect (b.1905)
- January 27 – Félix Labisse, French painter and designer (b.1905)
- February 6 – Ben Nicholson, English abstract painter (b.1894)
- June 10 – Gala Dalí, Russian artist's model (b.1894)
- June 29 – Pierre Balmain, French fashion designer (b.1914)
- August 3 – David Carritt, English art historian, dealer and critic (b.1927)
- September 11 – Wifredo Lam, Cuban artist (b. 1902)
- September 17 – Ettore DeGrazia, American impressionist, painter, sculptor, and lithographer (b.1909)
- October 9 – Charles E. Brown, English aviation photographer (b.1896)
- October 10 – Jean Effel, French painter, caricaturist, illustrator and journalist (b.1908)
- November 3 – Alejandro Bustillo, Argentine painter and architect (b. 1889)
- November 27 – Radomir Stević Ras, Serbian painter and designer (b. 1931)
