= The Anxious City =

Painting by Paul Delvaux

- Artist: Paul Delvaux
- Year: 1940–1941
- Medium: Oil on canvas
- Dimensions: 200 cm × 247 cm (79 in × 97 in)
- Location: Private collection

The Anxious City (French: La ville inquiète) is a painting made by Paul Delvaux in 1940–1941. It depicts a large number of upset people, most of whom are nude or partially nude, in front of a lake and classical structures. Among the characters who stand out are a naked self-portrait of Delvaux, a man in a bowler hat and a group of bare-breasted women. The man with the bowler hat made his debut in The Anxious City and would appear in several other Delvaux paintings.

Critics have focused on The Anxious City's complex composition, disquiet atmosphere and possible origin as a reaction to the German invasion of Belgium. It has been compared to works by Antoine Caron, Nicolas Poussin and René Magritte. The Anxious City was first exhibited in Brussels in 1944 and was part of the 1954 Venice Biennale. It was last sold at auction in 1998.

== Subject and composition ==
The Anxious City is painted in oil on canvas and has the dimensions 200 by 247 centimetres (79 in × 97 in). The Belgian painter Paul Delvaux created it between May 1940 and May 1941. The setting is a barren landscape with a body of water in the background to the left. To the right are classical structures, including stairs, gates, temples and palaces. Spread around the picture are several naked or partially naked people who look anguished. To the left in the foreground is a self-portrait of Delvaux as a seated nude man who rests his head on his hand. Behind the self-portrait is an older man with glasses, a black suit, a white shirt with a stiff collar and a bowler hat. Near these men is a human skull on the ground. To the right, on a staircase, is another man in a suit who holds out his hat like a beggar. In the foreground to the right is a group of bare-breasted women who wear skirts, each in a different colour and held up by a bow at the front.

Delvaux painted the man in the suit and bowler hat for the first time in The Anxious City and included him in several paintings over the next few years. This man typically appears unaware of his surroundings, whether he is among nude women or faces some catastrophe everybody else reacts to. Delvaux said he was based on a real person who walked by his house in Brussels every day. He wrote about the man's inclusion in The Anxious City:

I observed him on a number of occasions. He impressed me, and when I was painting this picture his presence in it became obvious, necessary even. To be frank, he slid into the composition with no other justification than this: in the middle of that town prey to all kinds of worries, that town at its wit's end, there was this presence of an ordinary man who each day carried out the same task and took the same route. In light of the imminent collapse of the threatened city, he performed perhaps a second function that his customary mediocrity would in some respects contradict.

== Analysis and reception ==
In 1969, André Fermigier of Le Nouvel Observateur wrote that The Anxious City is Delvaux's masterpiece and highlighted its ambitious composition. He wrote that it recalls The Massacres of the Triumvirate by Antoine Caron, the depictions of panic in Nicolas Poussin's paintings and "bizarre mythologies of the Renaissance". Fermigier wrote that its elements are combined in a way that evokes the atmosphere of the time when it was made. Ronny Cohen wrote for Artforum in 1985 that the complex composition turns the figures into symbols through their scale, positions and contrasts between neutrally coloured areas and red and yellow surfaces. He interpreted the painting as a work about death and the horror felt during World War II, contrasted by the suited man who emits a sense of reason, and by the bare-breasted women at the front, whose radiating skin made Cohen interpret them as goddesses who witness the tragedy of mortals.

The art historian Virginie Devillers and the critic Eugénie De Keyser interpreted The Anxious City as a reaction to the German invasion of Belgium. De Keyser wrote that it stands out among Delvaux's paintings with its many preparatory studies, where place and people accumulate into an inescapable sense of disquiet. Devilliers connects the man in the suit and bowler hat to the paintings of René Magritte. She writes that the suited man, the women at the front and the naked, seated man, whom she describes as Delvaux portrayed as an ephebe, are "lost in their own dream", making them strangers to the mass of anxious people around them. The literary scholar John Fletcher writes that the painting projects "melancholy, disquiet and bafflement" in a way reminiscent of the novels of Alain Robbe-Grillet, especially Topology of a Phantom City (1976). The literary scholar Jeannette Baxter calls The Anxious City a post-apocalyptic work where people seem to be sleepwalking or traumatised. She writes that the crowded scene combined with a complete lack of eye contact between the figures creates "an overwhelming sense of loneliness".

The Anxious City is referenced and features as an intertext in the post-apocalyptic novel The Drowned World by J. G. Ballard, published in 1962. The short story "Siestas" by Julio Cortázar, published in Último Round (1969), was inspired by several Delvaux paintings. The man in the suit from The Anxious City appears in a nightmare. In 1970, a detail from the painting was featured on a Belgian postage stamp.

== Provenance ==
The Centre for Fine Arts in Brussels exhibited The Anxious City as part of a Delvaux solo exhibition in December 1944 and January 1945. It was shown at the 27th Venice Biennale in 1954. It was acquired by René Gaffé in Brussels who sold it to a private collector in 1953. It was sold through Christie's in 1998 for 2,971,500 pounds. The price was a new record for a Delvaux painting. A set of 61 ink studies was sold through Christie's in 2011 for 133,250 pounds, more than four times the estimated price.
