= Saint-Idesbald =

Coordinates: 51°06′028″N 2°036′051″E

Sint-Idesbald
- Deelgemeente
- Sint-Idesbald
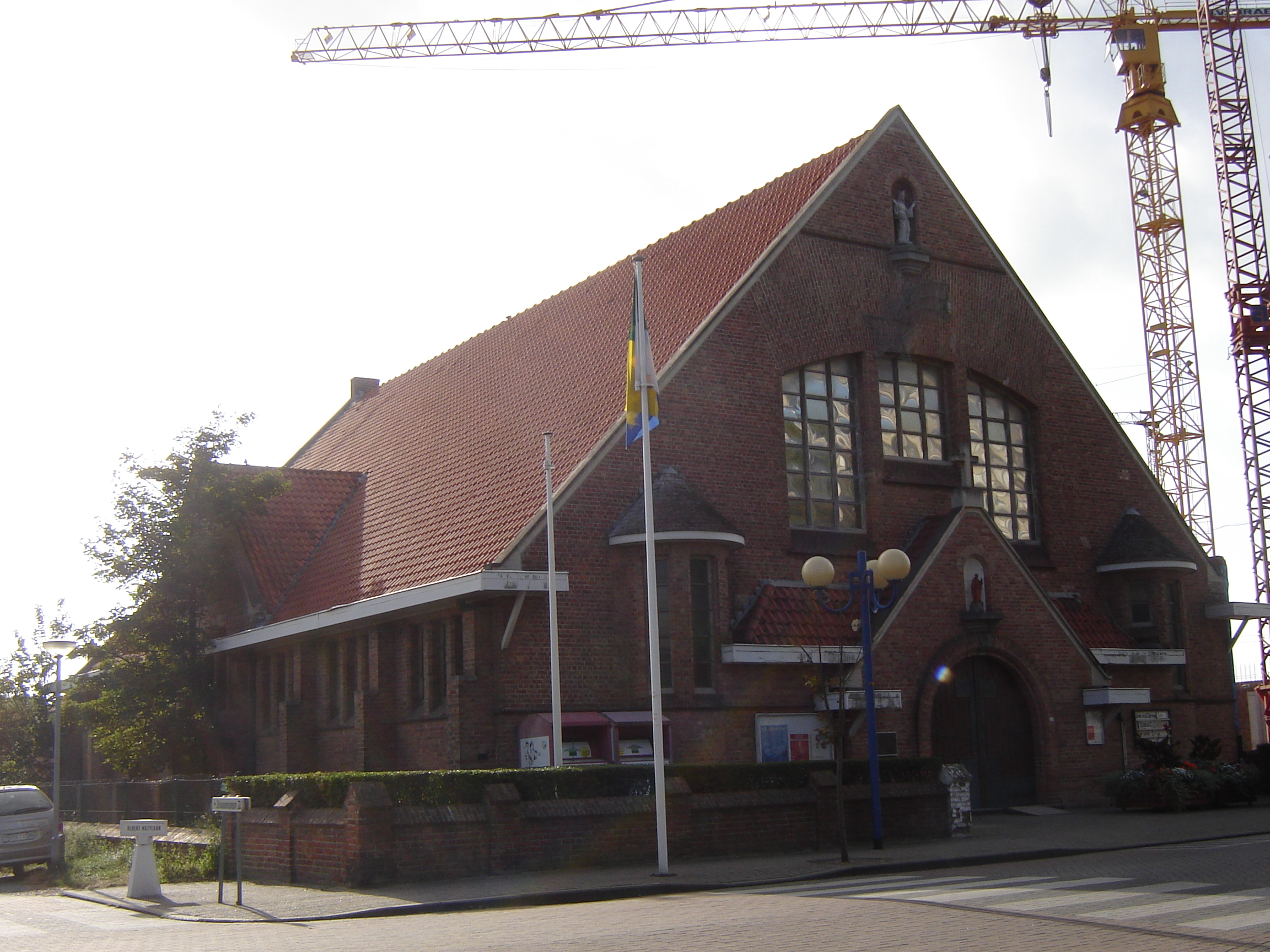
- Church of St. Idesbaldus, Saint-Idesbald.

- Sint-Idesbald ("V") on the map of Koksijde
- Country: Belgium
- Province: West Flanders
- Municipality: Koksijde
- Source: NIS
- Postal code: 8670

Saint-Idesbald (French pronunciation: [sɛ̃tidɛsbal]; Dutch: Sint-Idesbald) a village at the Belgian West Coast, part of Koksijde, which also includes Oostduinkerke. Its name refers to Saint Idesbald (or Idesbaldus), a 12th-century abbot of the Abbey of Ten Duinen.

In 1931, George Grard set up his studio at Saint-Idesbald, where his house became a rendezvous of artists including Pierre Caille, the Haesaerts brothers, Edgard Tytgat and Paul Delvaux.

In 1982, the Paul Delvaux Museum opened in Saint-Idesbald.
