= The Road to Rome (painting) =

Painting by Paul Delvaux

- Artist: Paul Delvaux
- Year: 1979
- Medium: Oil on canvas
- Dimensions: 160 cm × 240 cm (63 in × 94 in)
- Location: Private collection

The Road to Rome (French: La Route de Rome) is a 1979 painting by the Belgian painter Paul Delvaux. It depicts a European town square in twilight, with a number of women, many of whom are nude or semi-nude, scattered around the scene. Three high, open doors stand upright along the walkway.

== Themes ==
The central theme is the muse, the female figure as the force behind inspiration. The central woman is depicted as beautiful but inaccessible. According to the Paul Delvaux Foundation, "she not so much evokes sexuality as refers to a troubling aesthetic physicality". Delvaux was largely influenced by Italian painters, but the cold colour scale relates to his identity as a Northern European. The scenery relates to Brussels, the Wallonian countryside as well as Delvaux's interest in classical antiquity. By juxtaposing classical and modern elements, Delvaux tried to create a sense of timelessness.

Although others frequently have called Delvaux a surrealist, he repeatedly stressed that he was not an adherent of Sigmund Freud's teachings, nor did he put any psychoanalytical references in his paintings.

== Provenance ==
The painting belonged to the Paul Delvaux Foundation until 2016, when it was sold as part of a fundraising campaign. According to Martine Gautot, president of the foundation, "Delvaux himself foresaw that certain works from the permanent collection could be sold in order to allow the Foundation and the Museum to develop".

The painting was sold through Sotheby's in New York on 14 November 2016 as part of the auction Impressionist & Modern Art Evening Sale. The buyer paid 2,652,500 US dollars.

== Bibliography ==
- Marc Rombaut, Paul Delvaux, New York, 1990, no. 149, illustrated in color p. 120
