= Dark Entries =

1980 single by Bauhaus

Single by Bauhaus
- Released: 18 January 1980
- Genre: Post-punk; gothic rock
- Length: 3:52
- Label: Axis; Beggars Banquet; 4AD
- Songwriters: Peter Murphy; Daniel Ash; Kevin Haskins; David J

Bauhaus singles chronology
"Bela Lugosi's Dead" (1979)	"Dark Entries" (1980)	"Terror Couple Kill Colonel" (1980)

"Dark Entries" is a song by the English gothic rock band Bauhaus, released as a stand-alone single in January 1980 by Axis (an early name for 4AD) and later issued on 4AD and Beggars Banquet. It features the 1944 painting Sleeping Venus by Paul Delvaux as cover art.

== Content ==
Dave Thompson of AllMusic noted that "Dark Entries" was outside of the band's normal reputation, being "far punkier" and played at a "breakneck pace". A storm of feedback and percussion starts the song, continuing for 45 seconds before vocalist Peter Murphy "finally unveils one of his most breathless vocals".

== Release ==
The single was released six times, the first in January 1980 on Axis with the catalogue number AXIS 3. When Axis realized that there was another company claiming that name, it changed the label's name to 4AD. The single was reissued in February 1980 on Beggars Banquet (BEG 37) and later in several editions on 4AD (BEG 37 and AD 3).

== Legacy ==
In a feature for The Quietus, Mick Mercer included "Dark Entries" at No. 4 on his list of "The Thirty Best Goth Records of All Time".

The band Hole used the song's main riff for their song "Mrs. Jones" on their first album, Pretty on the Inside (1991).

The band Preoccupations released a cover of "Dark Entries" as the penultimate track of their debut EP, Cassette (2013).

"Dark Entries" was featured on an episode of Superman & Lois.

== Track listing ==
1. "Dark Entries (single edit)" - 3:52
2. "Untitled"
