= George Grard =

Belgian sculptor

- Born: 1901; Tournai, Belgium
- Died: 1984 (aged 82–83); Saint-Idesbald, Belgium
- Education: Académie de Tournai
- Known for: Sculptures of female figures
- Style: Representational
- Awards: Prix Rubens (1930)

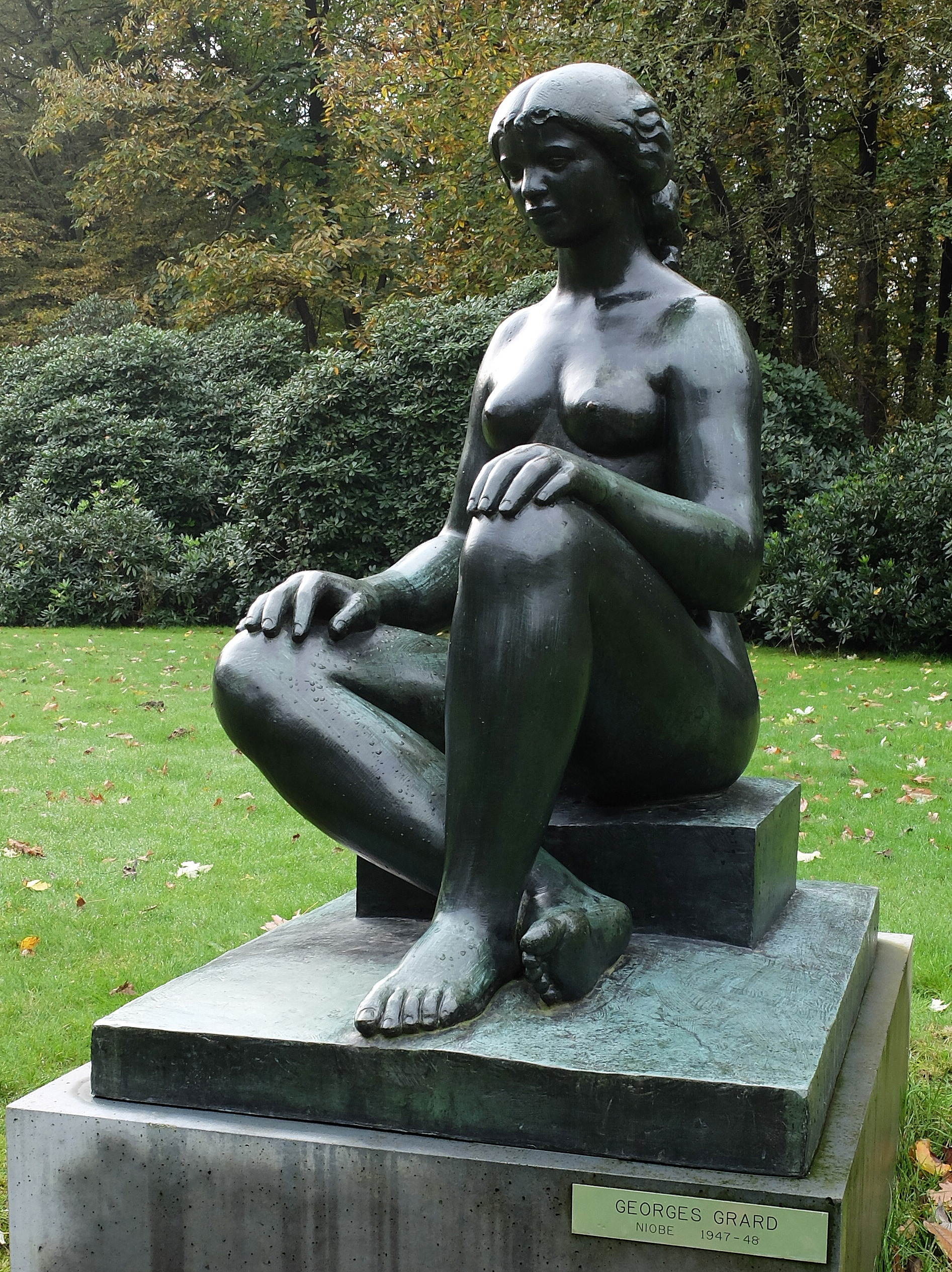
Georges Grard: Niobe (1948)

George Grard (1901–1984) was a Belgian sculptor, known mostly for his representations of the female, in the manner of Pierre Renoir and Aristide Maillol, modelled in clay or plaster, and cast in bronze.

Grard was born in Tournai to a family of modest means and entered the Académie de Tournai in 1915, but his real calling as a sculptor became apparent when he followed a course in sculpture in 1922 with Maurice De Korte (1889–1971). In his native city he met Pierre Caille, and later, in a Brussels foundry, Charles Leplae. Having won the Prix Rubens (1930), he left for Paris, where he encountered the sculpture of Charles Despiau, Aristide Maillol and Pierre Renoir, which influenced his mature style. In 1931, he set up his studio at Saint-Idesbald, non the coast, where his house became a rendez-vous of artists including Pierre Caille, the Haesaerts brothers, Edgard Tytgat, and Paul Delvaux.

In 1935, he was commissioned to create a sculpture for the rose garden at the Exposition universelle et internationale. Two years later Henry Van de Velde asked him for a work for the Belgian pavilion of the Exposition internationale, 1937. In the nineteen-fifties Grard, still in full possession of his mature powers, received repeated public commissions: the Seated Figure at the Banque Nationale, Brussels (1950), La Mer, fronting the post office at Ostend (1955, illustration), the Naïade at Tournai (1950), and Earth and Water, near the Albert Bridge at Liège (1964).

George Grard died in Saint-Idesbald in 1984.

== Koksijde ==
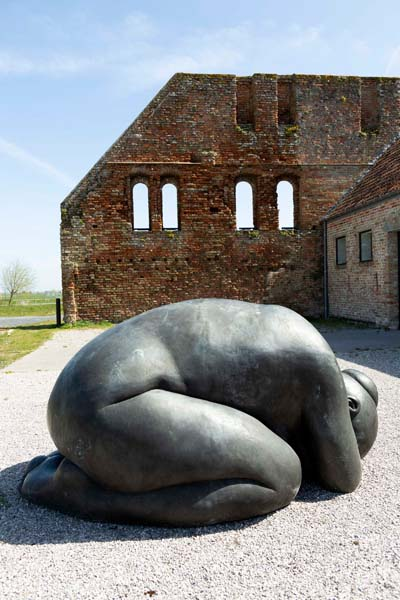
Koksijde

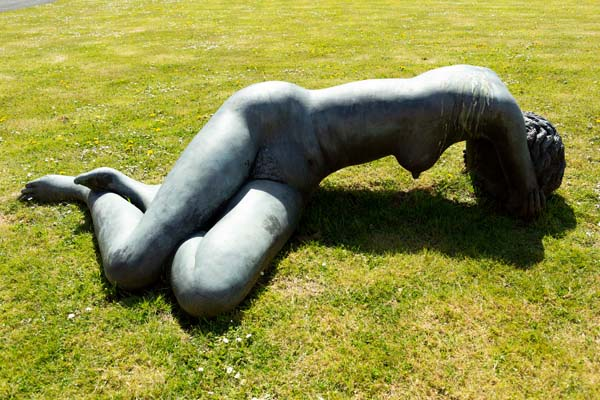

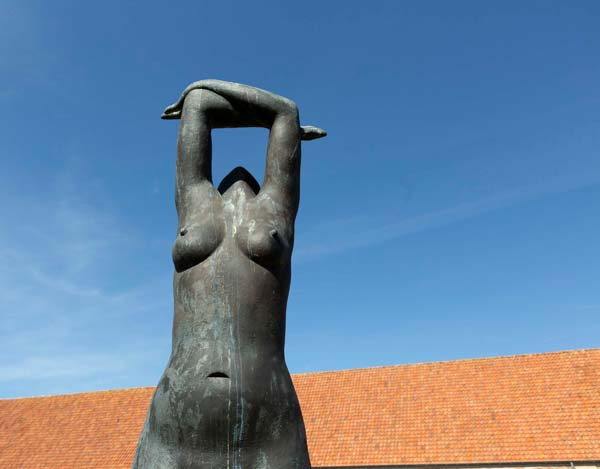

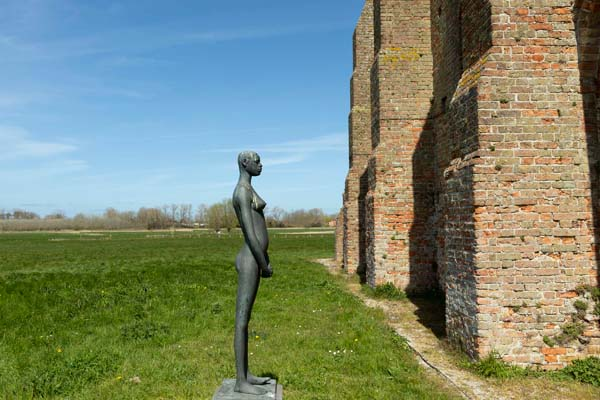

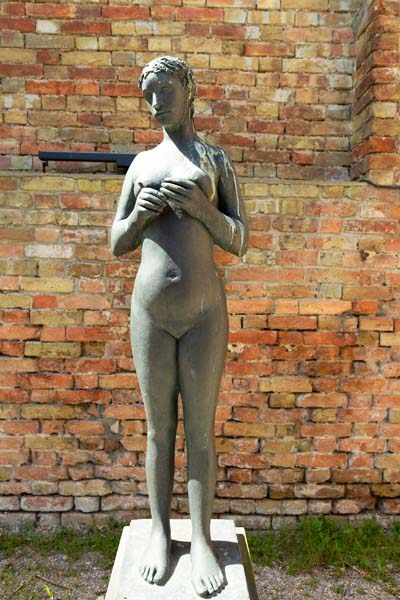
