= Sleeping Venus (Delvaux) =

1944 painting by Paul Delvaux

- Artist: Paul Delvaux
- Year: 1944
- Medium: Oil on canvas
- Dimensions: 172.7 cm × 199.1 cm (68.0 in × 78.4 in)
- Location: Tate, London

Sleeping Venus (French: La Vénus endormie) is a 1944 painting by the Belgian artist Paul Delvaux. It depicts a reclining Venus surrounded by anguished people at a town square with classical buildings. It was painted in Brussels while the city was bombed during World War II and Delvaux wanted to contrast the psychological drama of the moment with the calm Venus. The painting has been in the collection of Tate in London since 1957.

== Subject and composition ==
Sleeping Venus depicts a town square flanked by classical buildings at night. To the right is a building with two horses' heads, based on decorations from the old Cirque Royal in Brussels, and at the back is a closed temple or temple-like building. The square is populated by several nude women with their arms stretched out as in desperation; in the foreground a woman enters from the right with an upset expression, and several women gesture while on their knees. To the left at the front are a standing skeleton and a clothed dressmaker's dummy. Dominating the picture at the front is a chaise longue in Empire style where a nude Venus figure reclines with closed eyes and her hands behind her head. Sleeping Venus is painted in oil on canvas and has the dimensions 172.7 cm × 199.1 cm (68.0 in × 78.4 in). It is signed "P. DELVAUX / 11-44".

== Analysis and reception ==
This was the fourth painting titled Sleeping Venus made by Paul Delvaux; the previous were made in 1932, 1943 and earlier in 1944. The subject had engaged Delvaux since a visit in 1929 or 1930 to the Spitzner Museum, a cabinet of curiosities that was part of the Foire du Midi, which is a yearly fair in Brussels. He was fascinated by the contrast between the fair, the monstrosities of the museum, and a wax sculpture of a sleeping Venus that was part of the museum's exhibition. This wax figure became the model for all his paintings of Venus. Delvaux made the fourth Sleeping Venus in Brussels while the city was bombed during World War II. He said he wanted to express the psychological "drama and anguish" of the moment and contrast it with "the calm of Venus".

The art historian Virginie Devillers says all of Delvaux's Venus paintings portray a state between sleep and wakefulness and share their contrast between calm and violence. The paintings from 1944 stand out due to their involvement of other characters, and the second of them differs from the first with its outdoors setting and more dramatic staging, expressing the tension of a particular time and place. The historian of politics Jill Locke uses the painting as a meditation on shame and politics, and says its images of the calm, shamelessly nude Venus, the upset mourners and the seemingly abandoned political buildings can be viewed as an ambivalent depiction of "threat, stasis, and possibility".

== Provenance ==
Carlo van den Bosch in Antwerp purchased Sleeping Venus from Delvaux in 1944. It was purchased by Baron Urvater in 1957 for presentation at Tate in London, where it has been since then. The English rock band Bauhaus used a detail as cover art for the single "Dark Entries" in 1980.

== See also ==
- Belgium in World War II
