= Paul Delvaux Museum =

Art museum in Saint-Idesbald, Belgium

Coordinates: 51°6′21″N 2°36′37″E

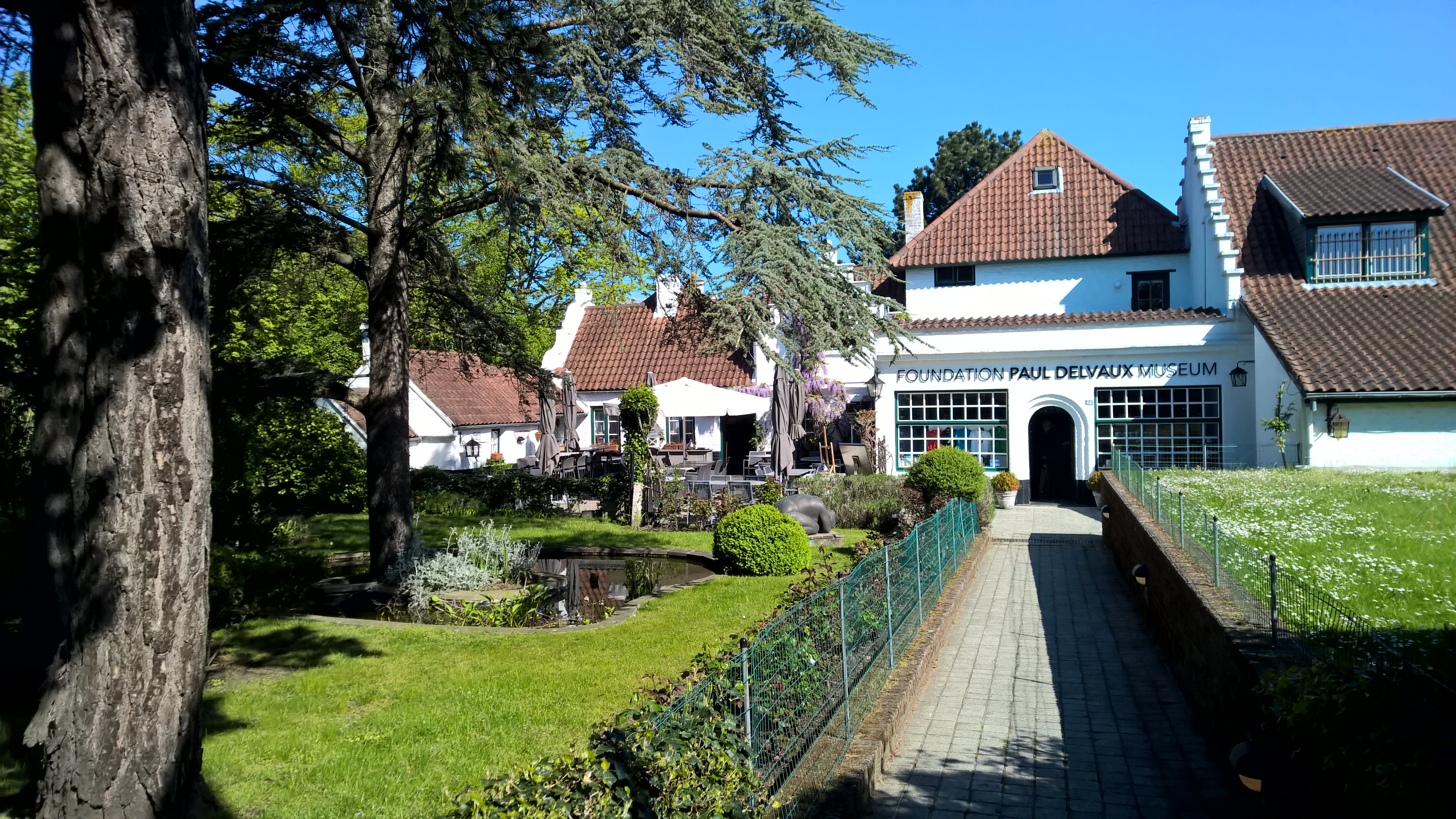
The Paul Delvaux Museum in 2018

The Paul Delvaux Museum (French: Musée Paul Delvaux) is a private museum in Saint-Idesbald, Belgium, devoted to the life and works of the painter Paul Delvaux. It was established in 1982 by the Foundation Paul Delvaux and houses the world's largest collection of Delvaux's works.

== History ==
In 1982, the Foundation Paul Delvaux took the initiative to establish the Paul Delvaux Museum, a private museum in Saint-Idesbald, Koksijde municipality, devoted to the painter Paul Delvaux (1897–1994). Delvaux had a personal connection to Saint-Idesbald and had built a house and studio in the style of a fishing cottage there in 1951.

A driving force behind the museum was Delvaux's nephew Charles Van Deun, who on the foundation's behalf purchased Het Vlierhof, a former fisherman's cottage that had been enlarged into a hotel-restaurant. Transforming it into a museum took six weeks and the inauguration took place on 26 June 1982, with Delvaux and his wife Tam present. After Delvaux's death in July 1994, the museum offered visitors to bid him farewell and write in condolence books in the presence of his open coffin. More than 2000 people came to the event. Delvaux and his wife bequeathed many works to the museum.

Beginning as an intimate museum, in the spirit of Delvaux's appraisal of modesty and his social reluctance, the Paul Delvaux Museum has since grown significantly in scale. In 1996, an underground extension was created under a car park opposite the main building, which resulted in a 29 m × 17 m (95 ft × 56 ft) room used to house a recently acquired collection of works, documents, photos and letters. It is connected to the museum through a tunnel. In the 2000s and 2010s, there was an attempt to create a major museum for Delvaux in Brussels, close to the Magritte Museum. When those plans were not realised, a larger scale for the museum in Saint-Idesbald emerged as a compromise. It underwent a major refurbishment and redesign and opened again in 2016. The current facilities cover around 1,000 m^{2} (11,000 sq ft).

== Collection ==
The Paul Delvaux Museum houses the world's largest collection of Delvaux's works, including paintings and drawings from all periods of his career. It exhibits personal belongings of Delvaux, whose interest in rail transport is reflected in many models of trams and trains. In the museum's garden is the sculpture De Kwartel (1976) by Delvaux's friend George Grard.

== See also ==
- List of single-artist museums
