= Art Fills the Void =

1982 mural in Portland, Oregon, U.S.

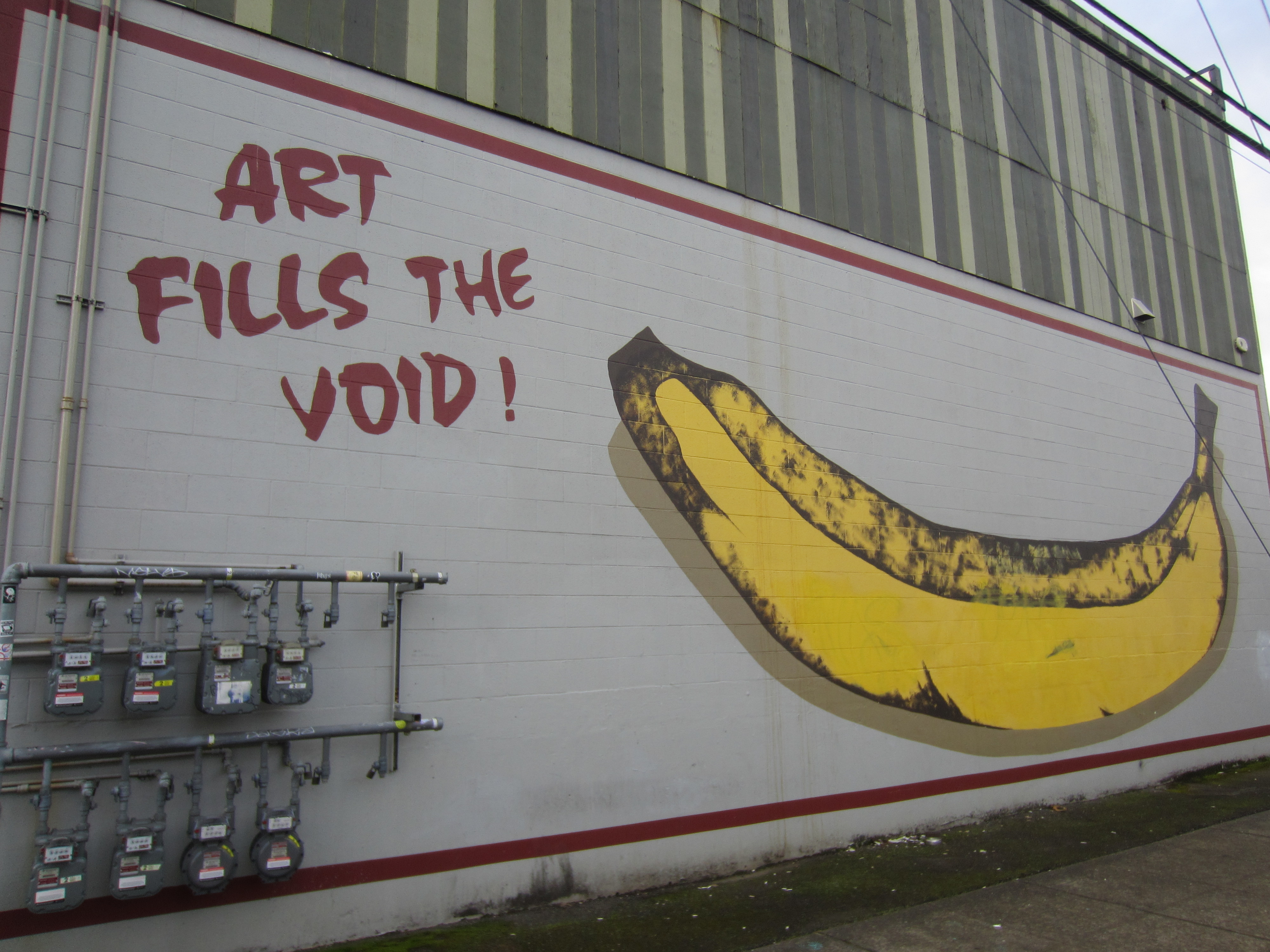
- The mural in 2021
- Artist: Gorilla Wallflare
- Year: 1982
- Dimensions: 7.6 m (25 ft)
- Location: Portland, Oregon, United States; 45°30′19″N 122°39′14″W

Art Fills the Void, often referred to as the "banana mural", is a 1982 public artwork by Gorilla Wallflare in Portland, Oregon, United States. The mural is maintained by the Portland Street Art Alliance.

== Description ==
Art Fills the Void is a mural of a banana by the art crew Gorilla Wallflare (or Guerilla Wall Fair), located at the intersection of 12th and Division Street in southeast Portland's Hosford-Abernethy neighborhood. It also has the text "Art fills the void!" Marie Claire has described the work as a "Velvet Underground/art fills the void tribute". It is approximately 25 feet wide.

== History ==
The work was created in 1982. It considered the city's second oldest street mural. After Gorilla Wallflare disbanded, the mural was maintained by property owners and community members from 1982 to 2015. The Portland Street Art Alliance (PSAA) has maintained the work since c. 2015. It costs approximately $1,000 per year to maintain, according to PSAA.

The mural was vandalized in November 2024. PSAA launched a Kickstarter campaign to fund the restoration and was successful in surpassing a goal of $1,000.

The work is the only surviving mural by Gorilla Wallflare.

== Reception ==
Marta Yousif included the work in the Portland State Vanguard's 2019 list of the ten "most Instagrammable" murals in Portland.

== See also ==
- 1982 in art
