= Koksijde =

Koksijde Koksyde (West Flemish): Coxyde (French)
- Municipality
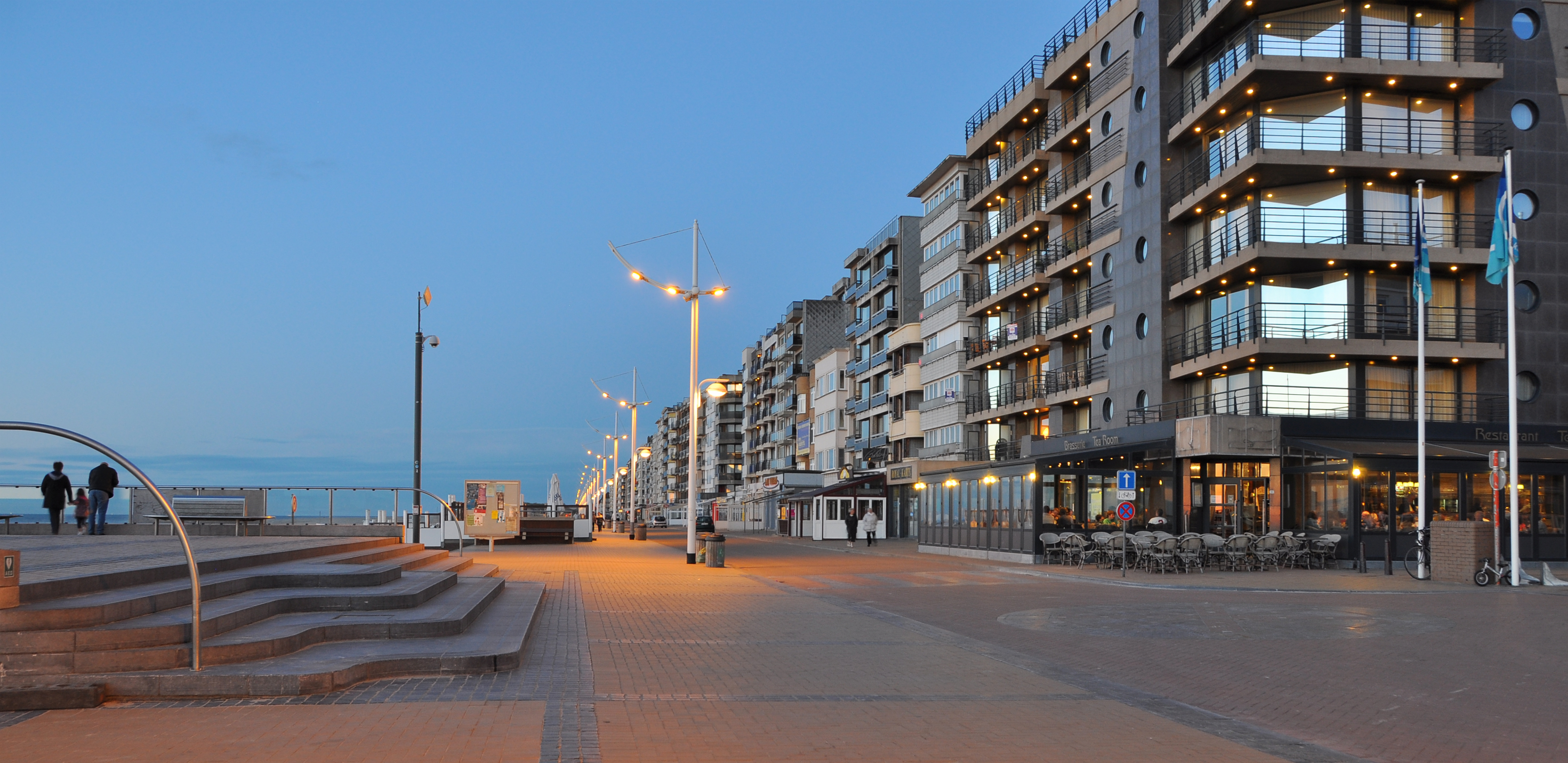
- Koksijde Zeedijk (Seadike)

- Flag Coat of arms

- Location of Koksijde in West Flanders
- Interactive map of Koksijde
- Location in Belgium
- Coordinates: 51°06′N 02°39′E
- Country: Belgium
- Community: Flemish Community
- Region: Flemish Region
- Province: West Flanders
- Arrondissement: Veurne

Government
  - Mayor: Marc Vanden Bussche (Open Vld)
  - Governing parties: Liste du Bourgmestre, Vooruit

Area
  - Total: 50.36 km^{2} (19.44 sq mi)

Population (2018-01-01)
  - Total: 21,957
  - Density: 436.0/km^{2} (1,129/sq mi)
- Postal codes: 8670
- NIS code: 38014
- Area codes: 058
- Website: www.koksijde.be

Koksijde (Dutch pronunciation: [ˈkɔksɛidə]; French: Coxyde [kɔksid]; West Flemish: Koksyde) is a town and a municipality in Belgium. It is located on the North Sea coast, in the southwest of the Flemish province of West Flanders.

The municipality comprises apart from Koksijde, the villages of Oostduinkerke, Saint-Idesbald and Wulpen.

On 1 January 2018, Koksijde municipality had a total population of 21,957 on a total area of 43.96 km^{2} (16.97 sq mi), which gives a population density of 499 inhabitants per square kilometre (1,290 inhabitants/mi^{2}).

Since 1995 Marc Vanden Bussche has been mayor of Koksijde.

== Municipality ==
The municipality of Koksijde comprises the "deelgemeenten" Koksijde, Oostduinkerke, Saint-Idesbald and Wulpen.

The old town centre of Koksijde is located about two kilometres from the shoreline. Close by the sea, a new tourist centre, Koksijde-bad, has developed. A bit to the west on the territory is the hamlet of Saint-Idesbald. The old town centre of Oostduinkerke is located more than one kilometre from the coastline as well, with Oostduinkerke-bad close to the sea. Over four kilometres inland is the rural polder village of Wulpen.

Koksijde, deelgemeenten and neighbouring villages. The yellow areas are urban areas.

Koksijde borders the following villages and municipalities:

- a. Nieuwpoort (city)
- b. Ramskapelle (Nieuwpoort)
- c. Booitshoeke (Veurne)
- d. Veurne (city)
- e. Adinkerke (municipality De Panne)
- f. De Panne (municipality)

== Tourism ==
The museum of the historical Ten Duinen Abbey is set in a modern building, explaining the religious and cultural importance of this abbey throughout history and showing the daily life of Cistercian monks from the early Middle Ages, beginning in 1107 till the death of the last monk in 1833. The archaeological site has been restored, and is open to the public. The attic of the museum contains a remarkable collection of liturgical silverware.

The British Military Cemetery (1940–1945) bears witness to British sacrifices in the Battle of Dunkirk.

The Paul Delvaux Museum in Saint-Idesbald houses the world's largest collection of works by the Belgian painter Paul Delvaux.

== Sports ==
The annual Duinencross Koksijde cyclo-cross race, part of the UCI Cyclo-cross World Cup, takes place in the municipality. In 1994 and 2012 the UCI Cyclo-cross World Championships were held here. Since 2019, the town has also been the finishing location for the Bredene Koksijde Classic road cycling race.

Koksijde operates the Koksijde Golf ter Hille golf club.

== Gallery ==
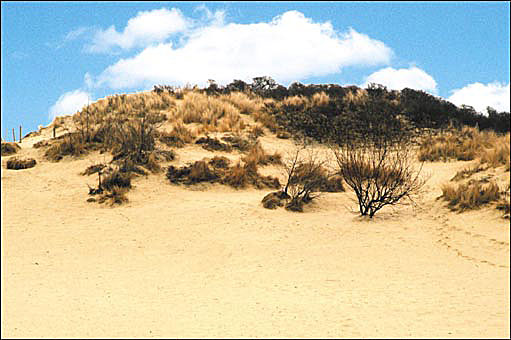
Hoge Blekker, highest dune on the Flemish coast

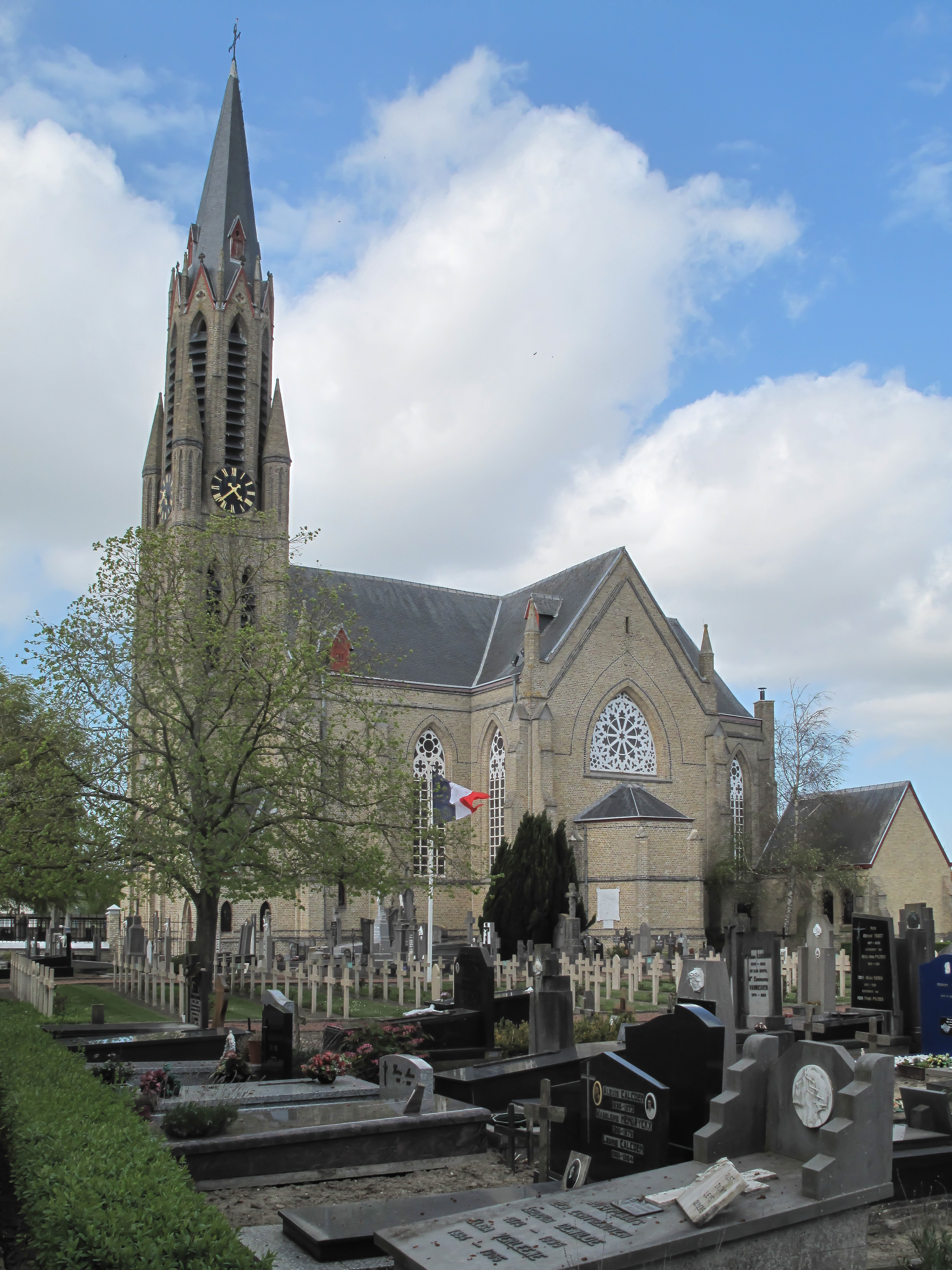
Koksijde, church: de Sint Pieterskerk

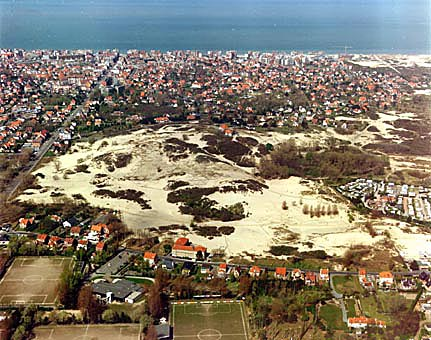
Aerial view of Koksijde

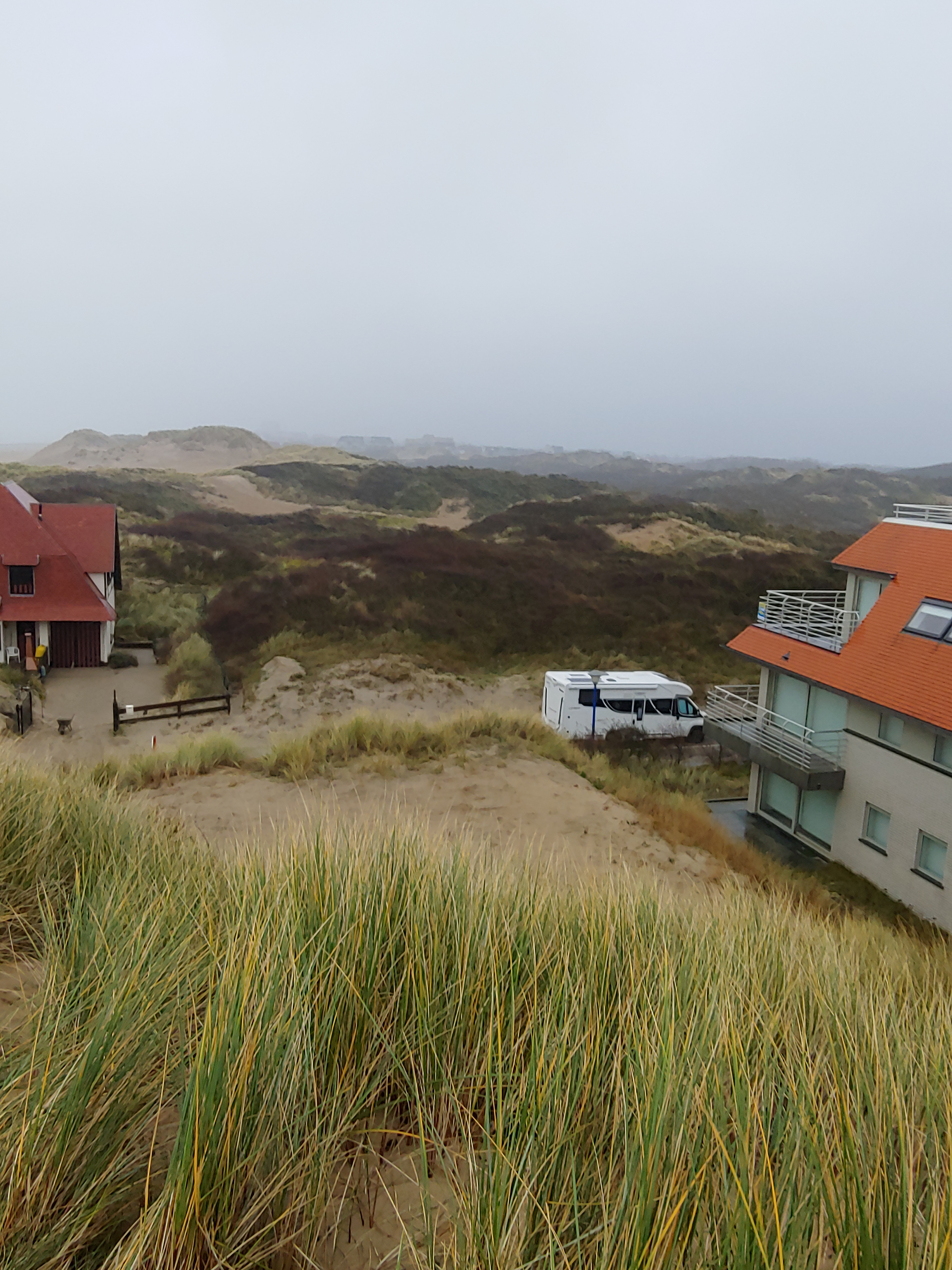
View of the dunes

== See also ==
- Koksijde Air Base

== Sister cities ==
- Albina and Galibi, Suriname.
