= Pierre Caille (sculptor) =

Belgian artist

Pierre Jules Louis Lucien Ghiskain Caille (11 January 1911, in Tournai – 24 October 1996, in Linkebeek), was a Belgian sculptor, painter, engraver, ceramicist and jeweller.

Caille briefly attended the Academy of Tournai (1926) and the advertising section in La Cambre (1931), and ceramics (1938) and is also close to Roger Guérin (1896 in Jumet – 1954 in Bouffioulx), Henry van de Velde, George Grard, Charles Leplae. Pierre Caille is a multifaceted and atypical painter, draftsman, printmaker, sculptor, potter, jewelry designer. His inspiration shows a fertile imagination, and gives form to the wonderful and extraordinary. From 1949 to 1976, Pierre Caille is a professor at La Cambre, where he leads the class of ceramics.

== Honours ==
- 1975: Member of the Royal Academie.

== Work ==
- 1964: Monument aux Liégeois morts pour la liberté, with architect George Dedoyard, Albert I Bridge on the Meuse at Liege.
- 1980: Les Voyageurs, Botanique station of the Brussels Metro.
- 1982–1989: ...Psy, entrance porch of the Faculty of Psychology and Educational Sciences of the University of Liège at Sart-Tilman, Open Air Museum of Sart-Tilman.
