= Antoine Caron =

French painter

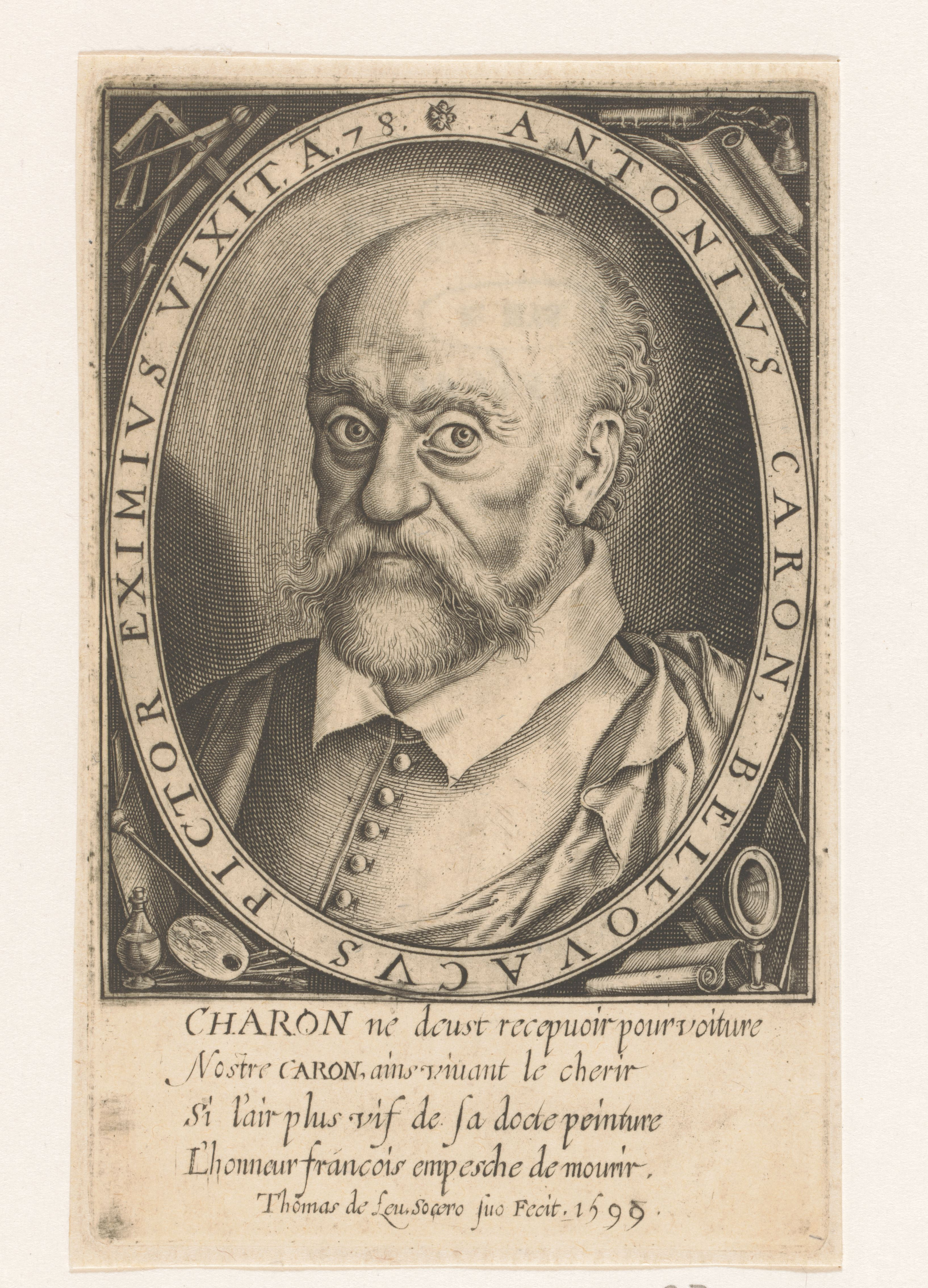
- Engraving of Antoine Caron by Thomas De Leu, 1599
- Born: 1521; Beauvais, France
- Died: 1599 (aged 77–78); Paris, France
- Citizenship: France
- Education: School of Fontainebleau
- Occupations: Artist, painter
- Spouse: Marie Dangobert
- Children: Louis Caron
- Parent(s): Phillipe Caron, Adele (Lamarre) Caron

Antoine Caron (1521–1599) was a French master glassmaker, illustrator, Northern Mannerist painter and a product of the School of Fontainebleau.

He is one of the few French painters of his time who had a pronounced artistic personality. His work reflects the refined, although highly unstable, atmosphere at the court of the House of Valois during the French Wars of Religion of 1560 to 1598.

== Life ==
Caron was born in Beauvais between 1521 and 1530 to Phillipe and Adele (Lamarre) Caron.

He married Marie Dangobert in 1555. Together, they had one son, Louis, who was born c. 1570.

== Career ==
He began painting in his teens doing frescos for a number of churches. Between 1540 and 1550 he worked under Primaticcio and Niccolò dell'Abbate at the School of Fontainebleau. In 1561, he was appointed the court painter by Catherine de' Medici and Henry II of France. As court painter he also had the duties of organizing the court pageants. In this way he was involved in organizing the ceremony and royal entry for the coronation of Charles IX in Paris and the wedding of Henry IV of France with Marguerite de Valois. Some of his surviving illustrations are from these pageants.

His drawings of festivities at the court of Charles IX are likely sources for the depiction of the court in the Valois Tapestries. He died in Paris in 1599.

== Art ==
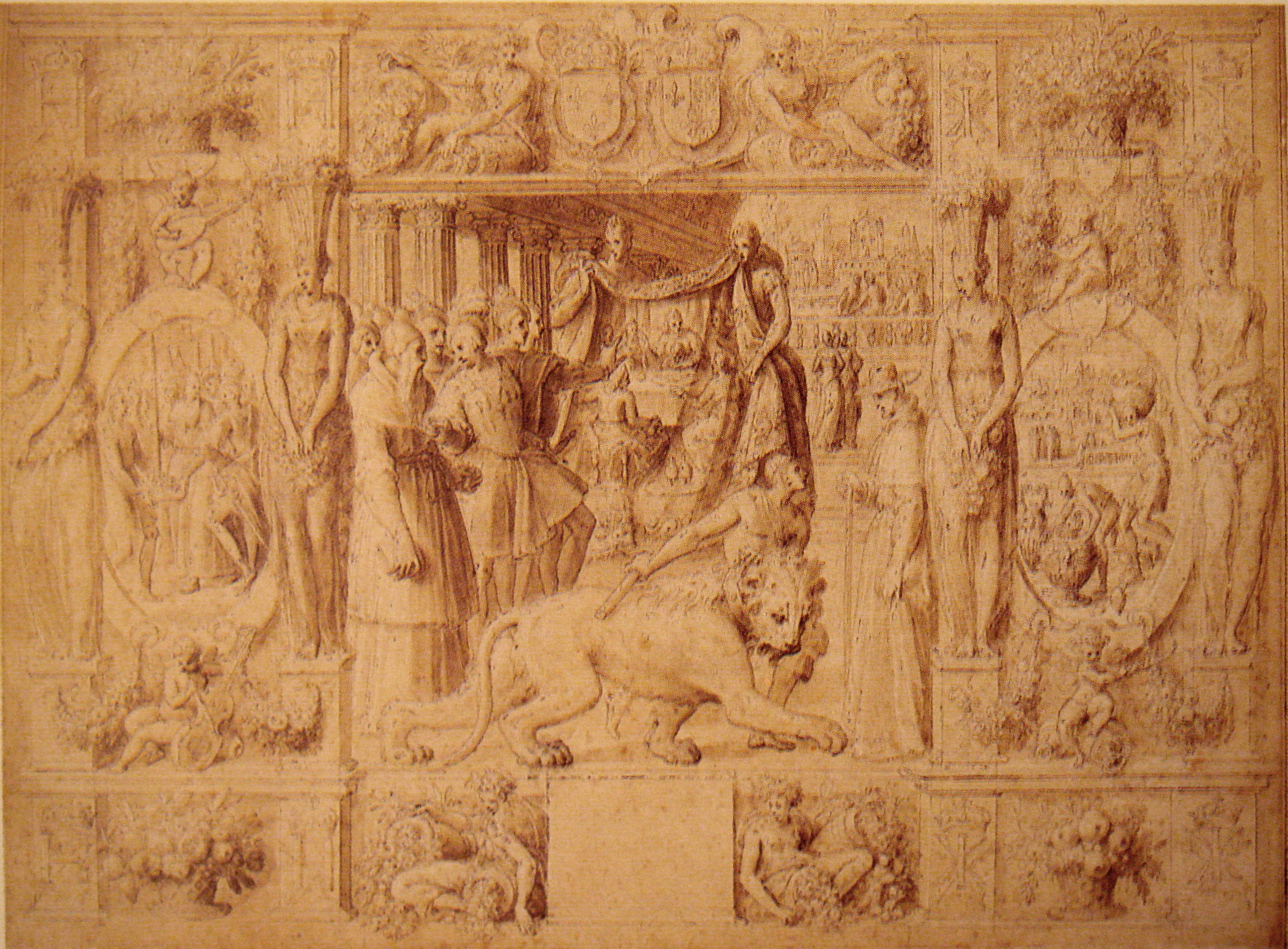
The Lion of Barbarossa by Antoine Caron, circa 1562, thought to depict the lion given to Francis I during the Ottoman embassy to France (1533)

Not many of Caron's works survive, but they include historical and allegorical subjects, court ceremonies, astrological scenes, and his massacres, done in the mid-1560s. An example is his only signed and dated painting, The Massacres of the Triumvirate (1566) which hangs in the Louvre. Caron used bright colors and incorporated unusual architectural forms. He often placed his human figures almost insignificantly on grand stages, as did his mentor dell'Abbate. His figures tend to be elongated, even in portraits such as Portrait of a Lady (1577).

Many works attributed to him are also attributed to others. As there is minimal documentation of French painting in that era, this is not unusual. Because Caron is relatively well known, his name is likely to be attached to paintings similar to his known works. In some cases, such painting are now ascribed "to the workshop of Antoine Caron", for example, The Submission of Milan to Francis I in 1515 (c. 1570).

== Selected works ==
- Massacres of the Triumvirate, 1566, oil on linen canvas, 116 × 195 cm, Musée du Louvre, Paris
- La Sibylle de Tibur, 1575/1580, oil on canvas, 170 × 125 cm, Louvre, Paris, (The Tiburtine Sibyl or Augustus and the Sibyl of the Tiber)
- Abraham and Melchisedek, c. 1590, wood, 80 × 94 cm. private collection, Paris
- Astronomers Watching an Eclipse or Dionysius the Areopagite Converting the Pagan Philosophers, 1570s, oil on canvas, 93 × 73 cm., formerly in the collection of Anthony Blunt, London, now at the J. Paul Getty Museum, Los Angeles
- Portrait of a Lady, 1577, Tempera on panel, Alte Pinakothek, München
- Le train de deuil Amors, Louvre, Paris (The funeral procession of Love or An Allegory of the Death of Love)
- Bagathan and Tharès Staatliche Graphische Sammlung (State Graphics Collection) in the Münchner Haus der Kulturinstitute (Munich Culture Institute), Munich
- The Elephant Carousel, 1598, oil on wood, 87 × 130 cm., private collection, Paris
- The Arrest and Supplication of Sir Thomas More (1478–1535) oil on wood, Musee de Blois, Blois
- Apotheose of Semele, c. 1585, oil on wood, 65 × 76 cm. private collection, Paris
- The Triumph of Winter, c. 1568, oil on canvas, 103 × 179 cm, private collection of Anne H. Bass
- Diane Chasseresse, 1550, oil on Louvre, Paris, (Diana, the Huntress) [School of Fontainebleau ... ]
- The Submission of Milan to Francis I in 1515, c. 1570, oil on wood, 50.5 × 66.8 cm, National Gallery of Canada, Ottawa, Ontario [workshop of ... ]

== Gallery ==
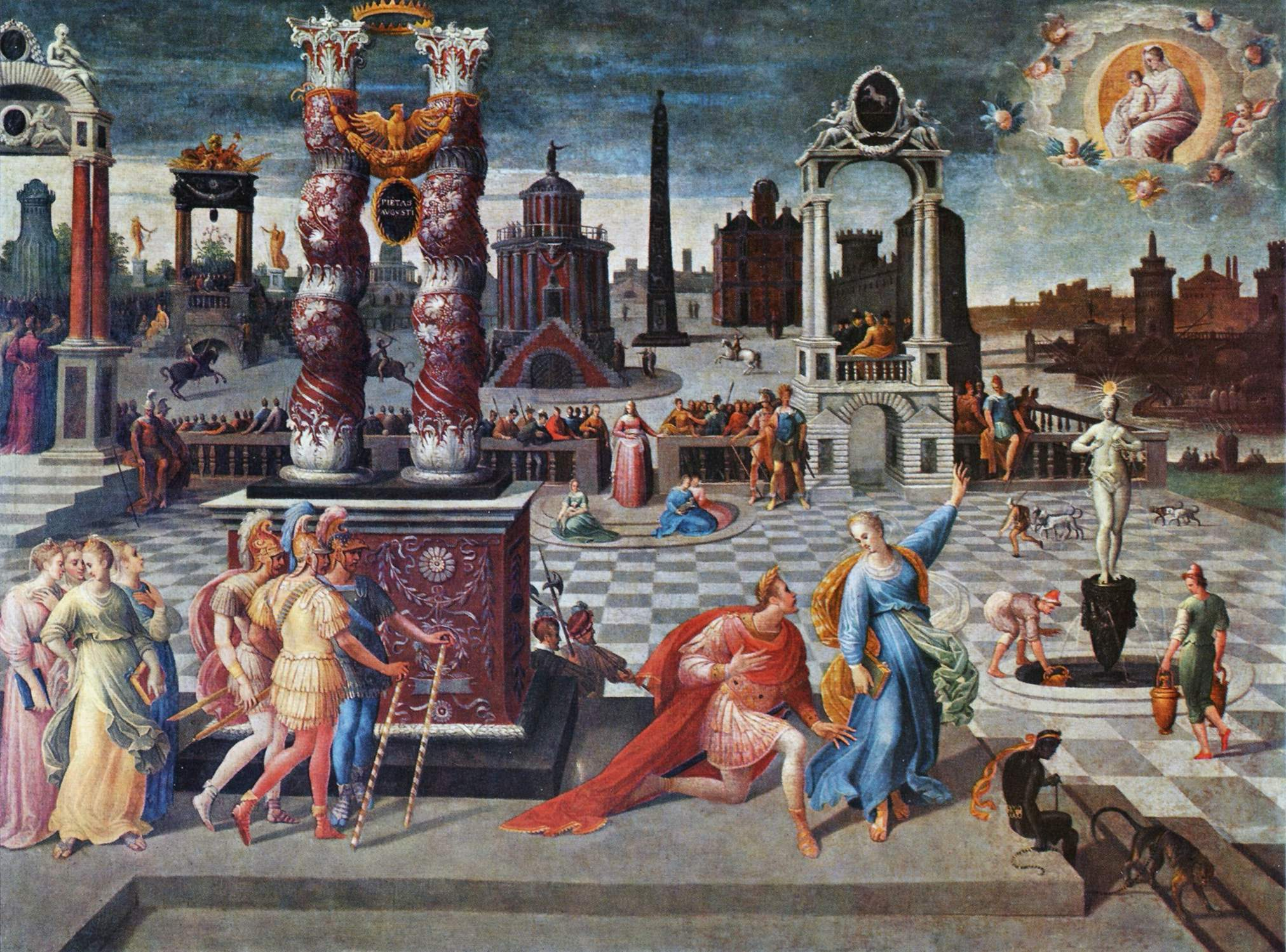
Augustus and the Sibyl of the Tiber (c. 1578)

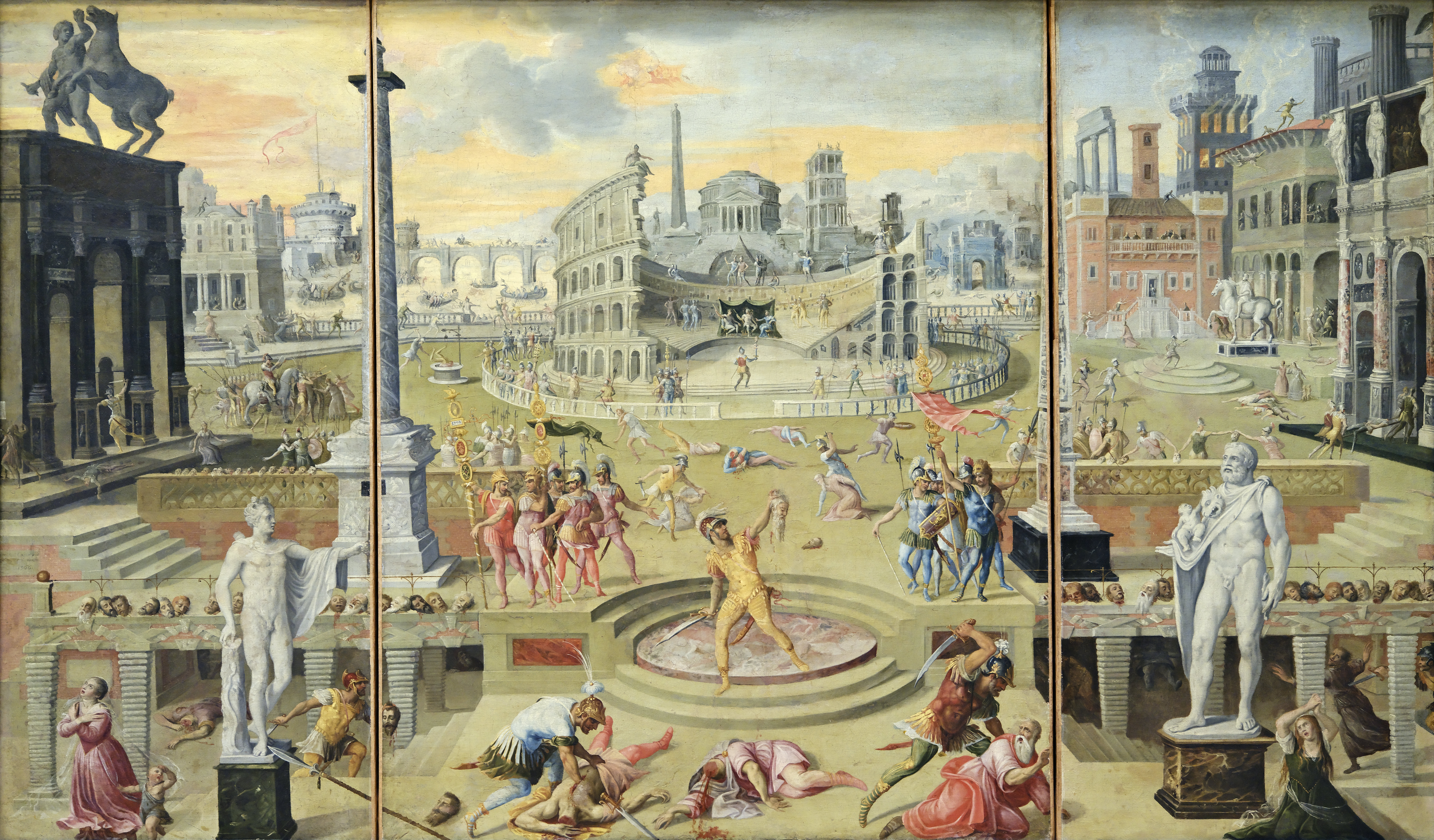
Massacres of the Triumvirate (1566)

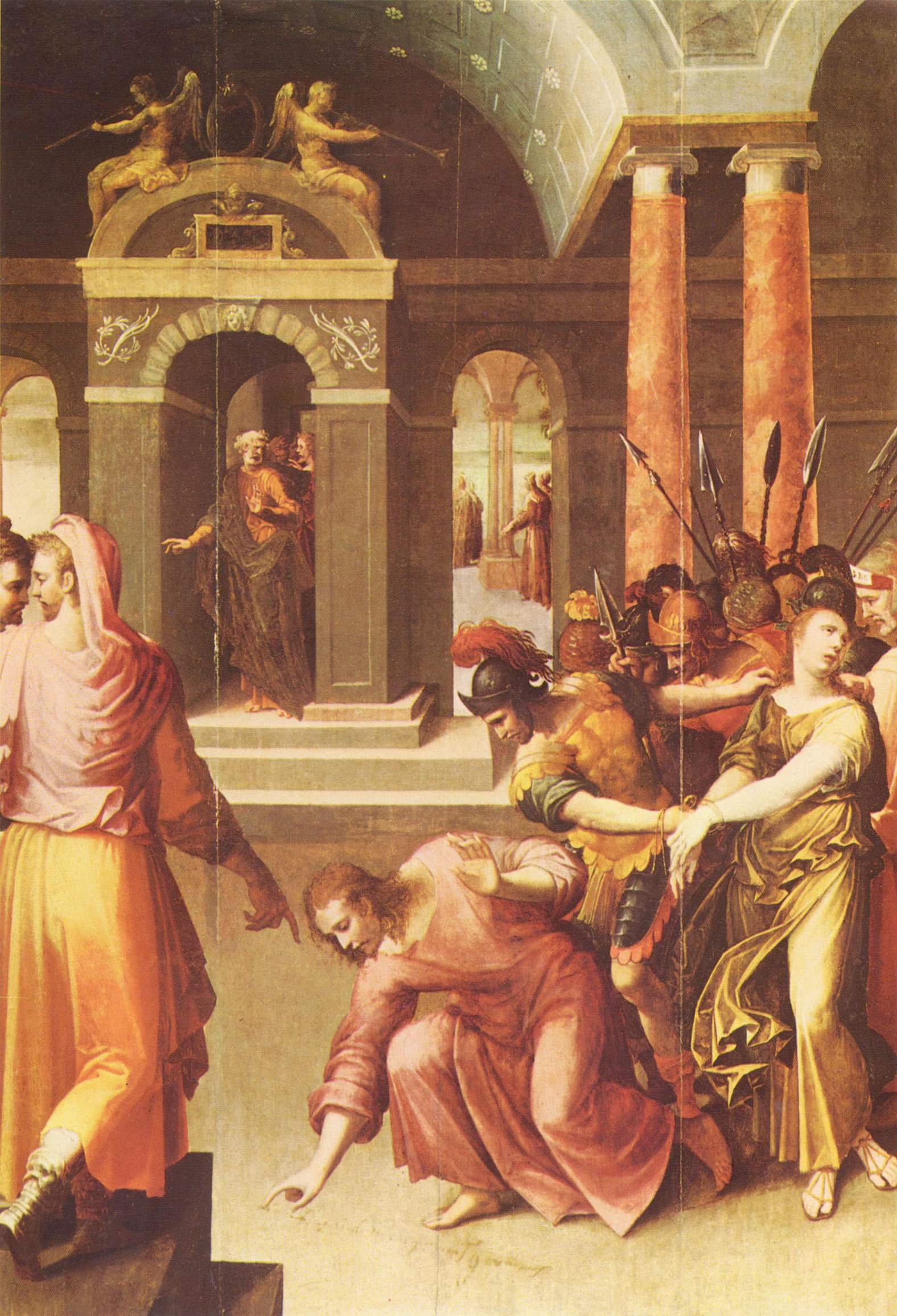
Henri Lerambert, Christ and the Adultress

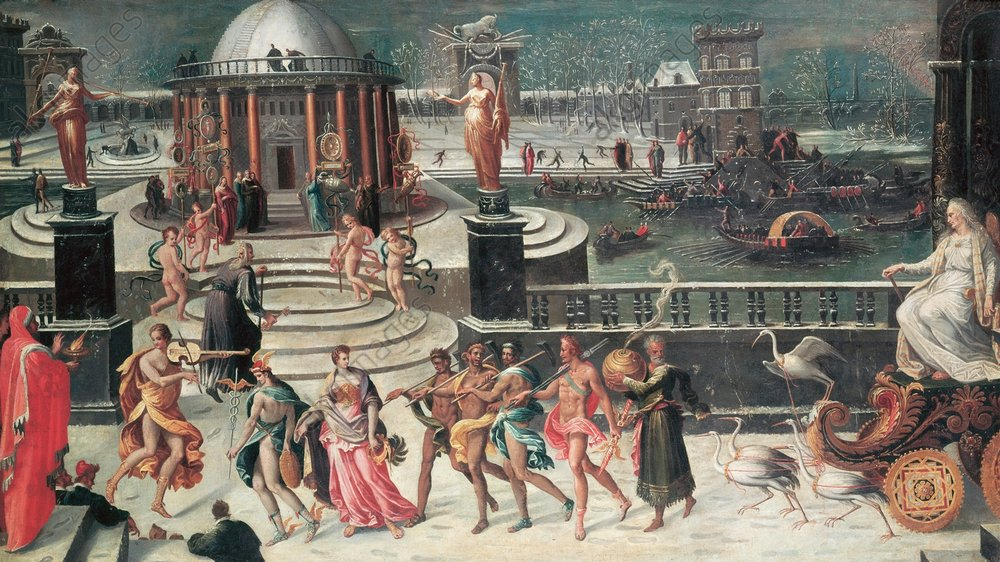
Triumph of Winter (c. 1568)

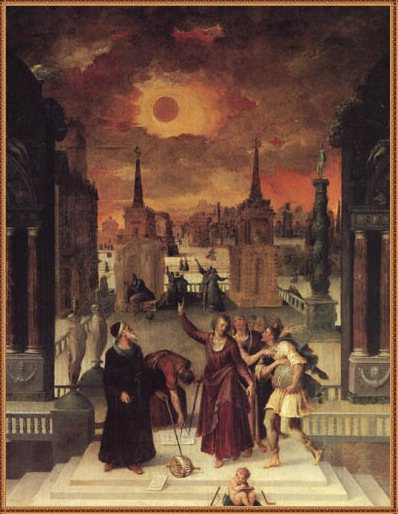
Dionysius the Areopagite Converting the Pagan Philosophers (c. 1570)

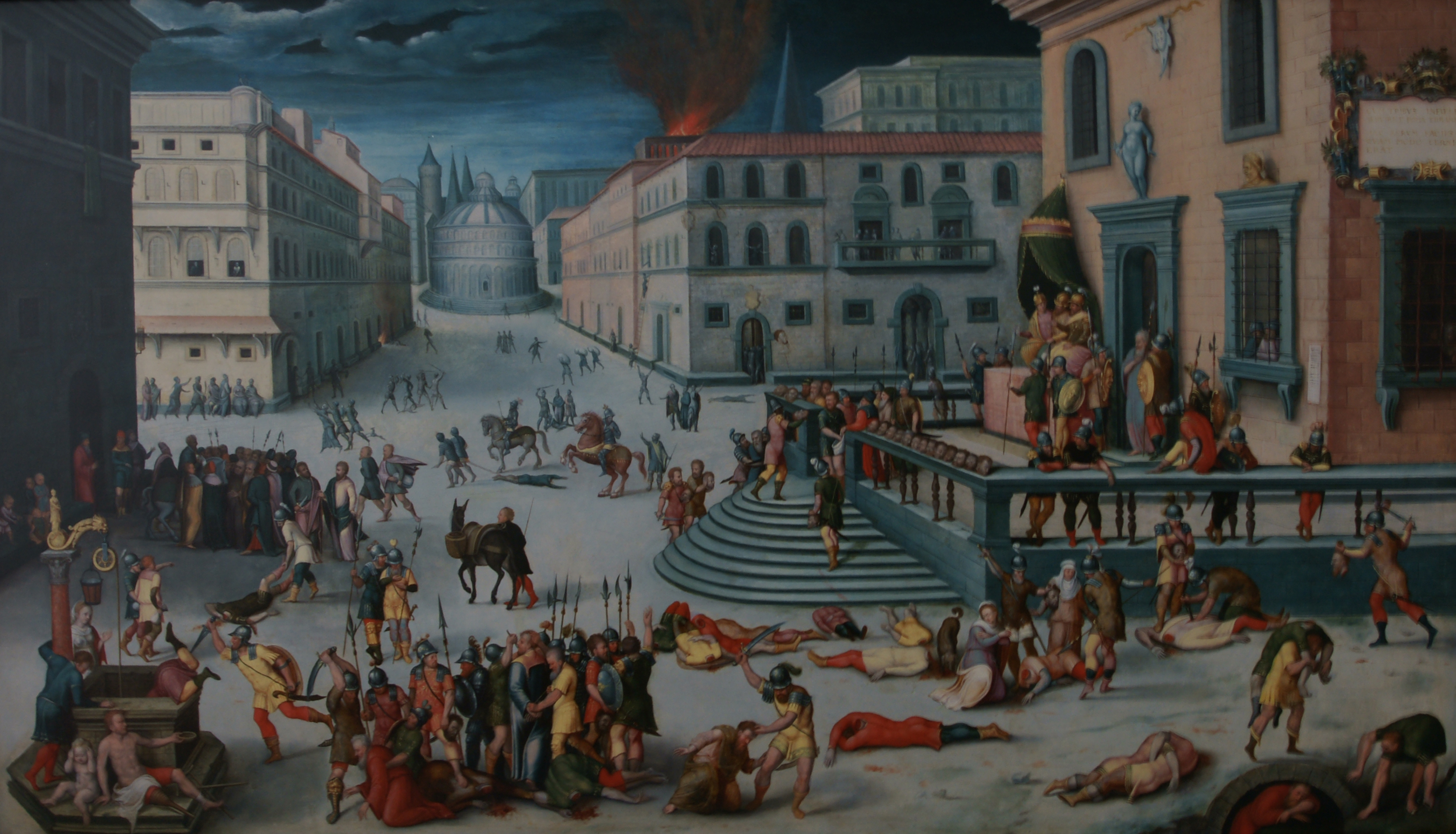
The massacre under the Triumvirate, Musée d'Art classique de Mougins
