= The Massacres of the Triumvirate =

1566 painting by Antoine Caron

- Les Massacres du Triumvirat (French)
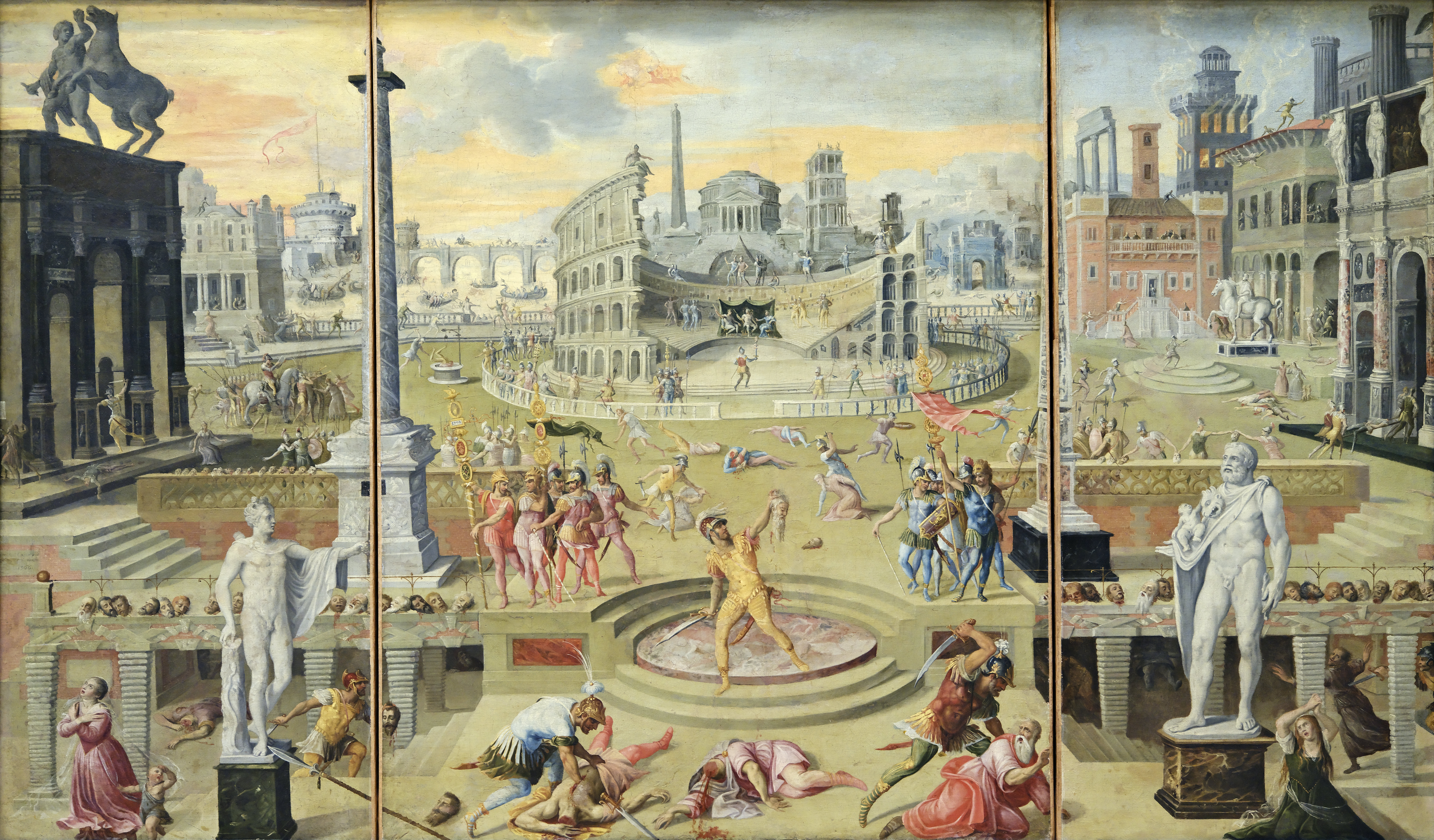
- Artist: Antoine Caron
- Year: 1566
- Catalogue: RF 1939 28
- Medium: Oil on canvas
- Movement: Northern Mannerism
- Dimensions: 116 cm × 195 cm (45 in × 76 in)
- Location: Louvre, Paris
- Accession: 1939

The Massacres of the Triumvirate is a 1566 oil on canvas painting by Antoine Caron, now in the Louvre Museum.

The only signed and dated work by Caron, it shows the Colosseum and other Roman monuments in the background and refers to the massacre of 300 opponents initiated by the Second Triumvirate in 43 BC and by extension to the massacres of Protestants in Caron's own time, during the French Wars of Religion.
