= Oostduinkerke =

Oostduinkerke Ôostduunkerke (West Flemish)
- Deelgemeente
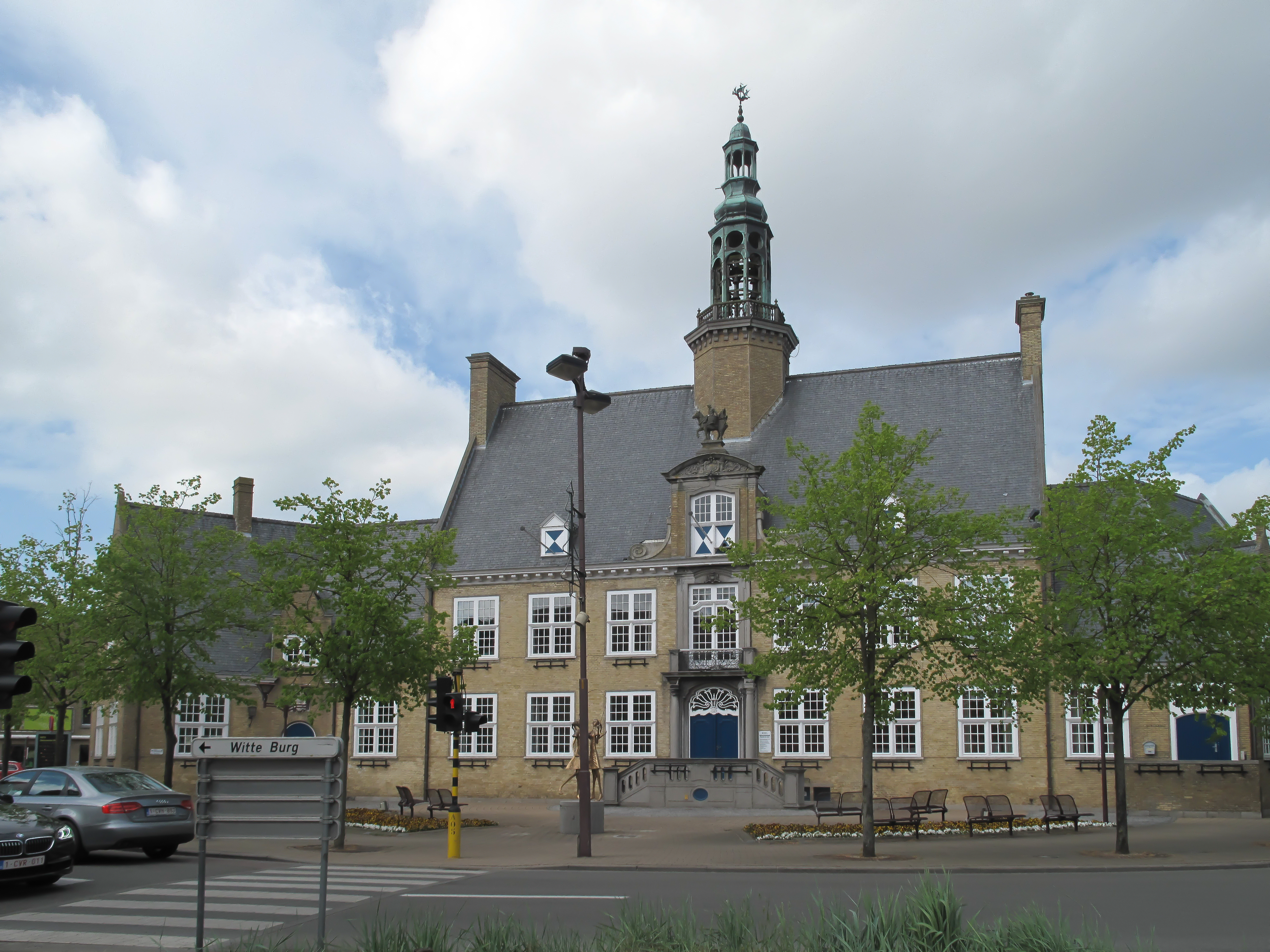
- Former townhall Oostduinkerke

- Coordinates: 51°07′13″N 2°40′43″E
- Country: Belgium
- Province: West Flanders
- Municipality: Koksijde

Population
  - Total: 8.534
- Source: NIS
- Postal code: 8670

Oostduinkerke (Dutch: [oːzˈdœyŋkɛrkə]; West Flemish: Ôostduunkerke; French: Ostdunkerque [ɔstdœ̃kɛʁk]) is a place on the southern west coast of Belgium, located in the province of West Flanders. Once a municipality of its own, Oostduinkerke now is a sub-municipality in the municipality of Koksijde.

The name Oostduinkerke translates as 'East Dunkirk'. The town originally shared its name with the city of Dunkirk in current-day France; therefore, in the 13th century, Oost- was added to its name to avoid confusion with its namesake further to the west.

Oostduinkerke lies amidst a dune area (approximately 2.4 km^{2}; 1 sq. mi.), which is now a protected nature reserve. Oostduinkerke's sandy beach stretches from 250 to 700 metres (270 to 800 yards) at ebb-tide and extends over 30 km (20 miles), via De Panne to the beach of Dunkirk (France), which explains why Oostduinkerke is popular with sand yachters and parakarters.

== Shrimp fishing on horseback ==
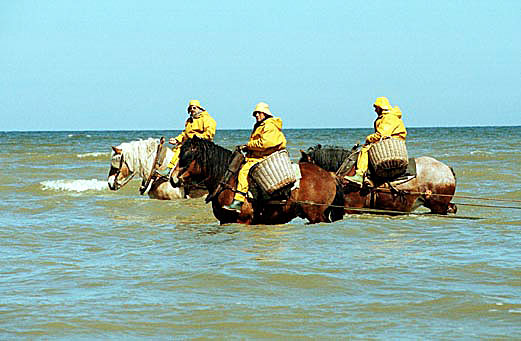
Oostduinkerke is the only place in the world where horseback shrimping is practised.

Oostduinkerke is known for its shrimpers on horseback, a considerable tourist attraction. The practice was once common across the coastal areas of the North Sea, but today it is only present in Oostduinkerke, where 17 fishers remain active as of 2021.

== Sights ==
Oostduinkerke has several museums. The National Fishery Museum gives a historical survey of Flemish fishery and shows among other things scale models of fishing boats from 800 AD up to the present, and an original fisherman's cottage. Other museums are: 'The Key and Lock Museum' (a unique historical survey of 3,000 years of keys and locks), a regional museum 't Krekelhof (The cricket court in Dutch) (a huge collection of craft objects and curiosities from the 19th century), and Florishof (old crafts and folkloristic objects).

Oostduinkerke is also home to Koksijde Golf ter Hille, a par-72 golf course.

The British Military Cemetery (1940–1945) bears witness to British sacrifices in the Battle of Dunkirk.

== Images ==
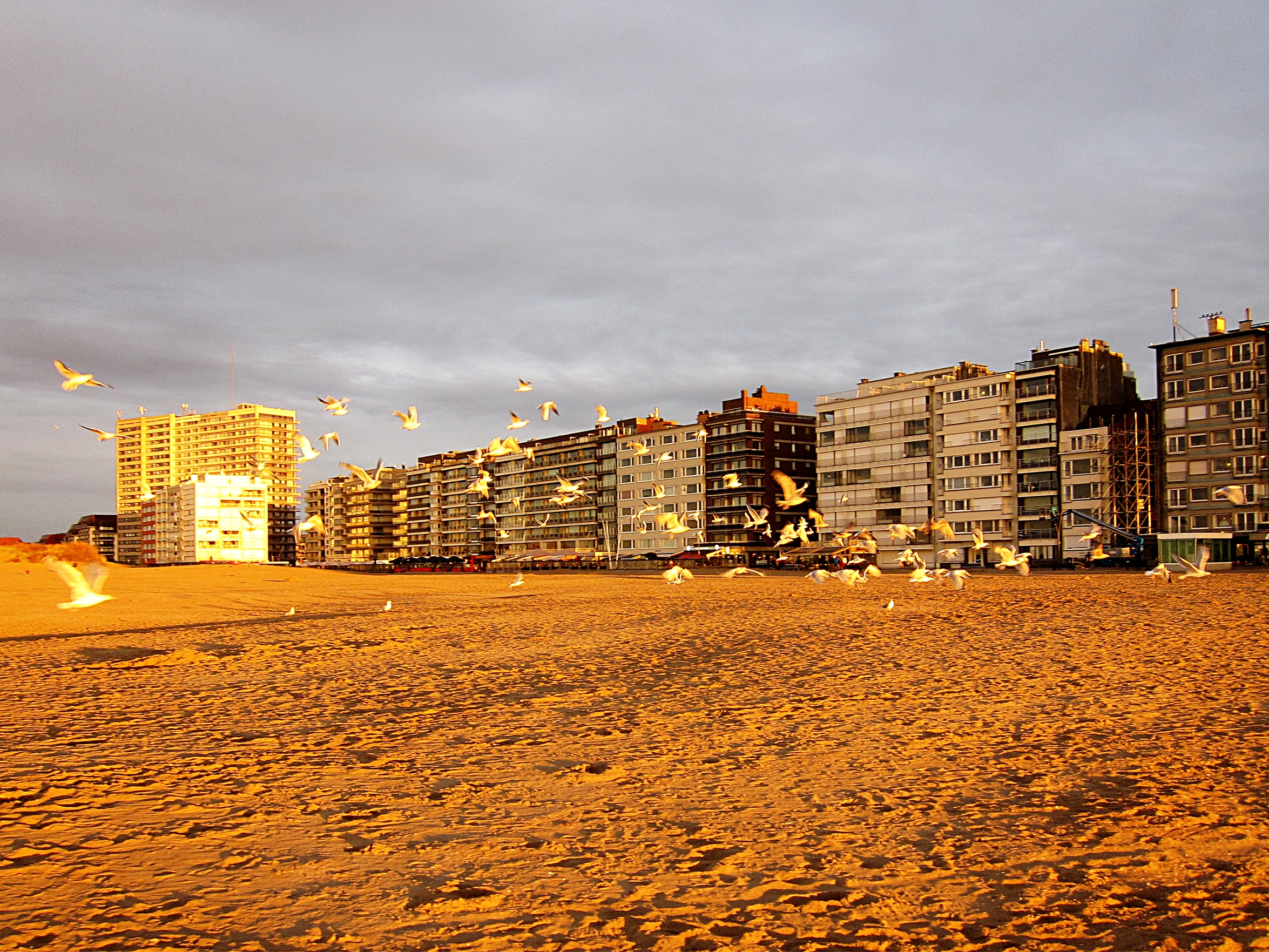
Oostduinkerke seaside apartments

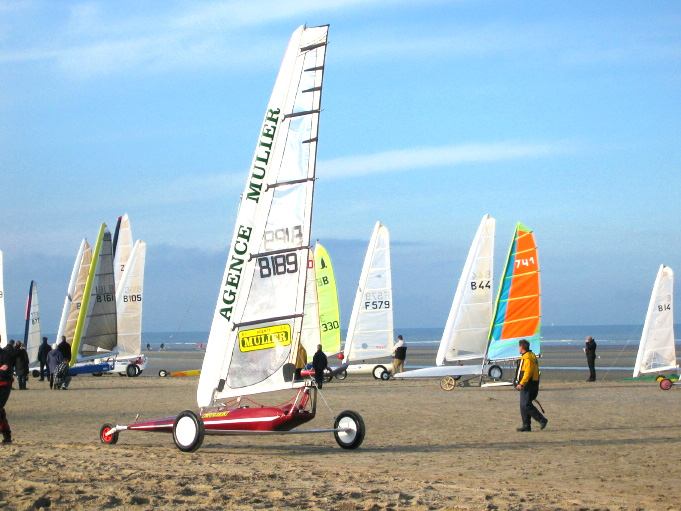
Sand-Yachting on Oostduinkerke beach

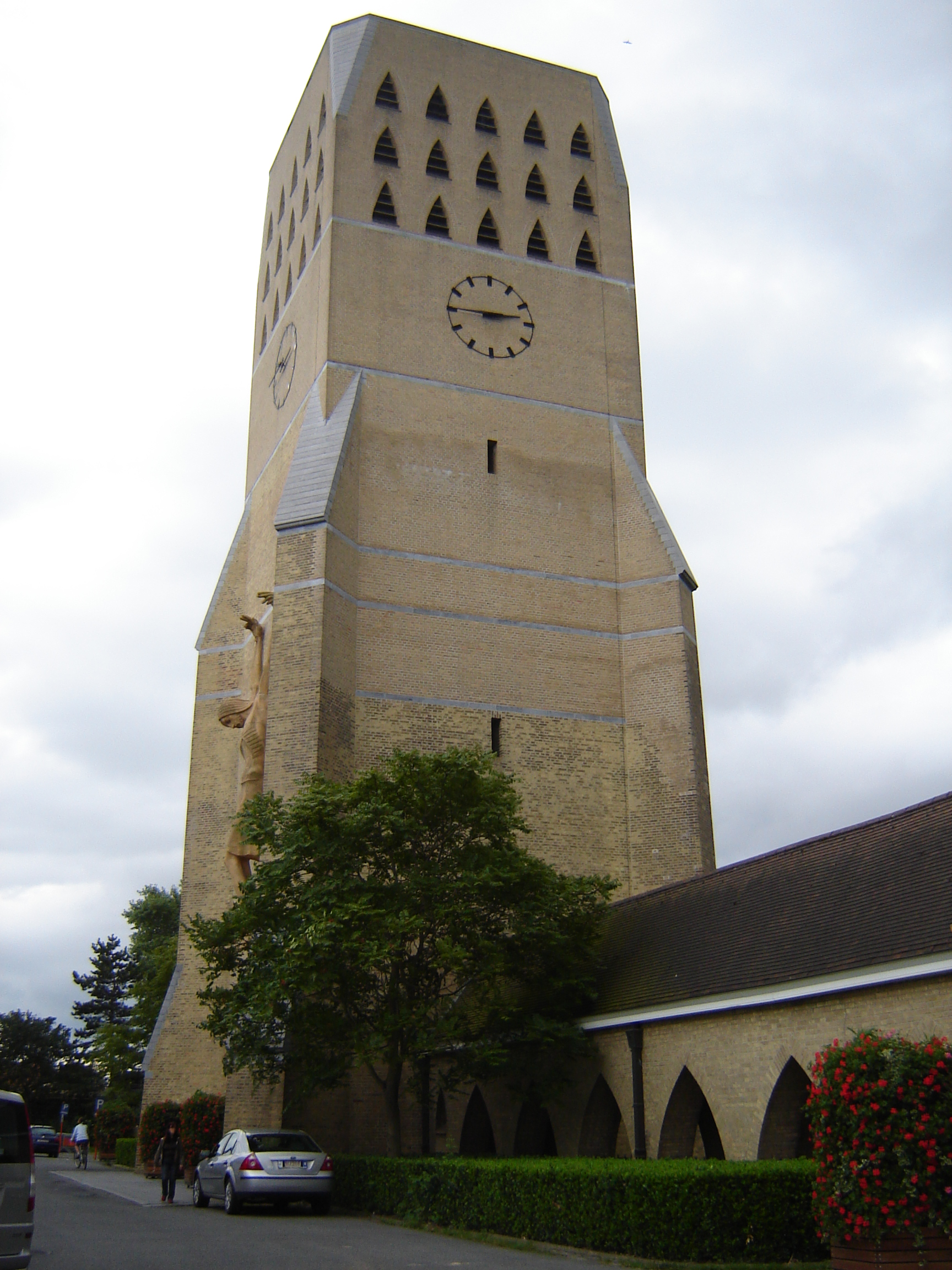
Sint-Niklaaskerk in Oostduinkerke

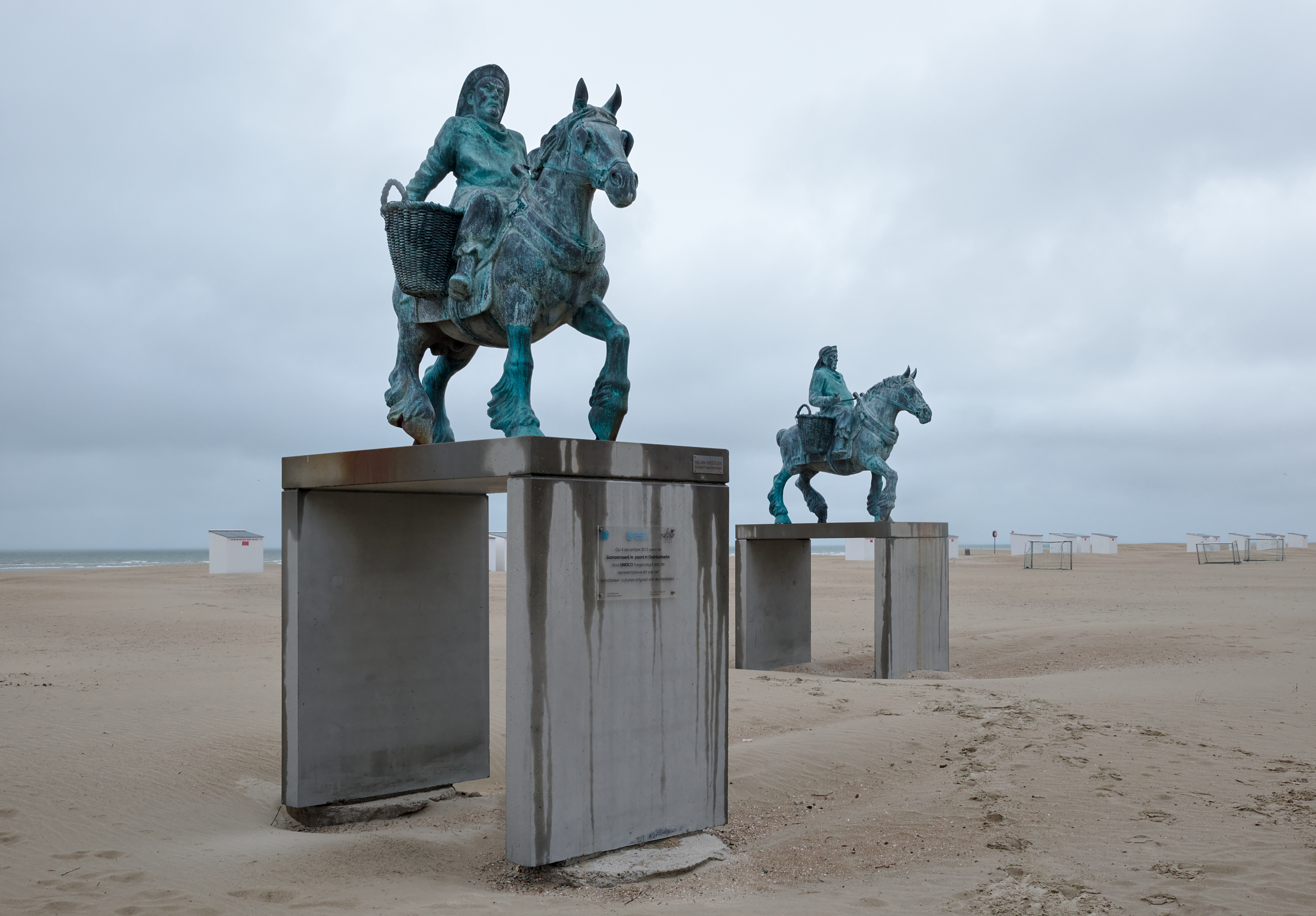
Cloned Paardenvisser statue

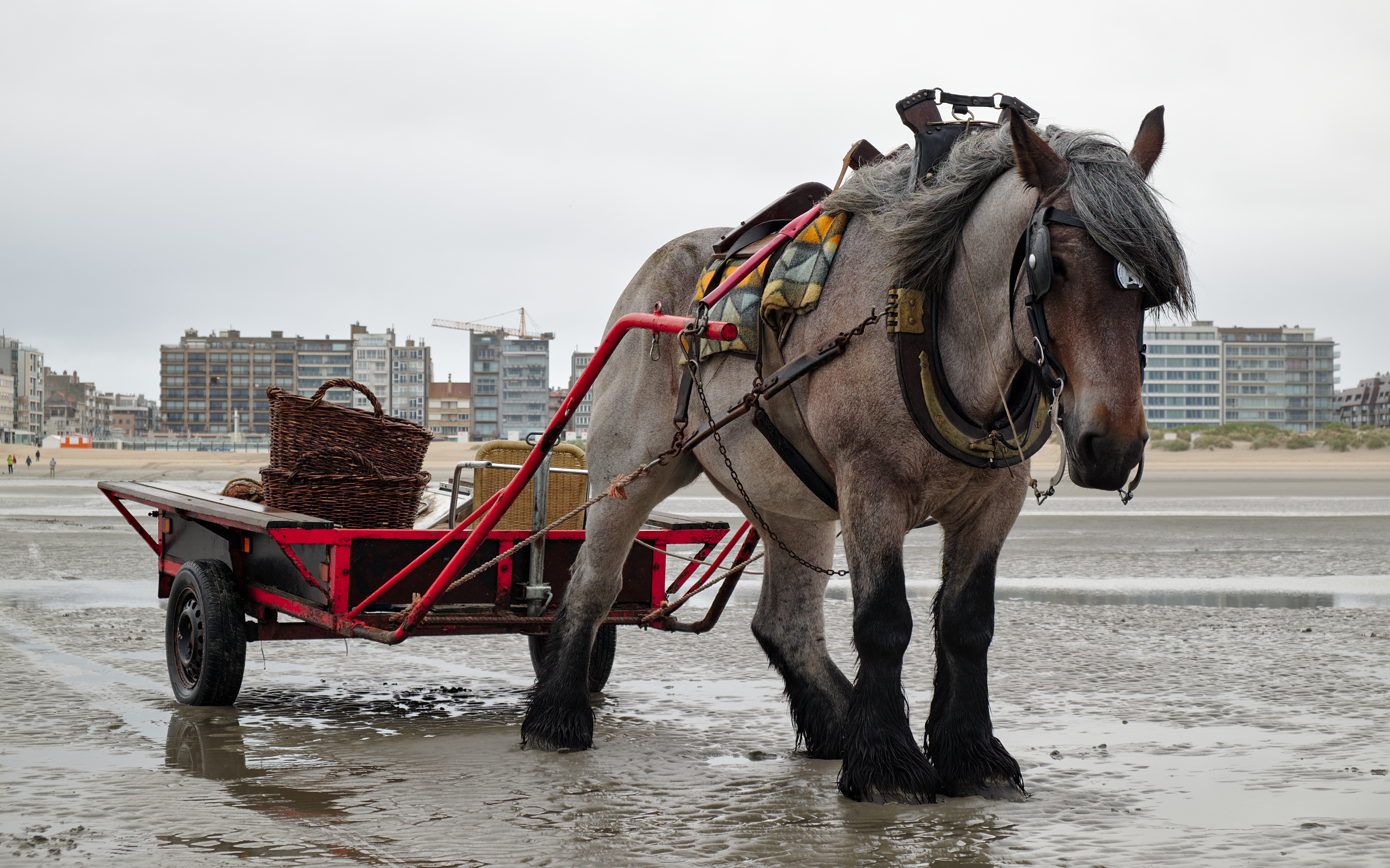
Brabançon draft horse on the beach
