= Émile Lucien Salkin =

Belgian painter

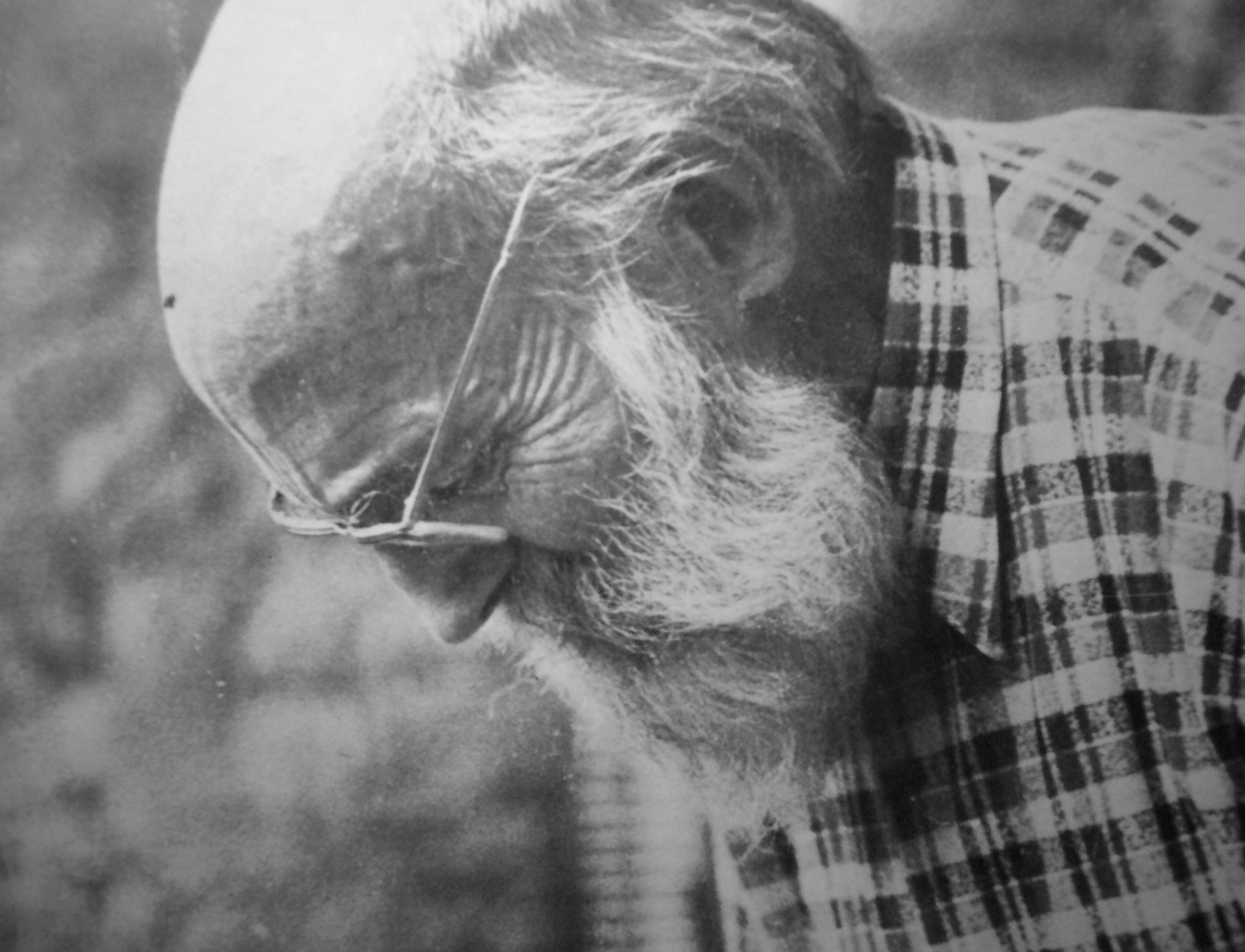
- Born: 19 December 1900; Saint-Gilles, Belgium
- Died: 27 August 1977 (aged 76); Cotignac, France
- Occupation: Painter

Émile Lucien Salkin (19 December 1900 – 27 August 1977) was a Belgian painter. His work was part of the painting event in the art competition at the 1936 Summer Olympics.
