= Bambi (artist) =

British street artist

- Born: Unknown; London
- Known for: Graffiti; Feminist art Social commentary Street art

Bambi is the pseudonym of a contemporary British street artist. Her work focuses on contemporary female identity and its relationship to patriarchal culture. She also highlights political and social injustice. Bambi is derived from the childhood family nickname Bambino.

Collectors of her work include Rihanna, Brad Pitt, and Adele. Bambi's stencilled work is described as gritty and masculine in appearance while exploring themes of feminism, and popular and street culture.

== Works ==
Bambi has created stencilled works across London. Her 2011 piece Amy Jade was a tribute to singer Amy Winehouse in Camden, while Diamonds A Girls Best Friend depicted a young Queen Elizabeth II as the Queen of Diamonds and was featured in Time magazine in 2012. In February 2017, Bambi created the mural Lie Lie Land on the wall of the Cross Street Gallery in Islington, depicting British Prime Minister Theresa May and U.S. President Donald Trump in the dance pose from the poster for La La Land. The work remained there until it was painted over by new owners in January 2018. In her first Italian solo show, Bambi exhibited during the 57th Venice Biennale. Bambi revealed a waterfront piece The Pope Gives Us Hope featuring the Pope reaching out to a polar bear in a capsizing boat; the work is designed to reflect the Pope's comments in late 2016 on climate change and his call to end environmental destruction. A long-term environmentalist, Bambi was further inspired after watching the issue-driven documentary Before the Flood by Leonardo DiCaprio and Fisher Stevens. The work can be seen at Ospizio Foscolo Santa Lucia in Fondamenta Sant'Anna 993/a, Castello 30122. On 31 August 2017, on the 20th anniversary of Princess Diana's death, Bambi unveiled Be As Naughty As You Want. The piece presents Diana as Disney's Mary Poppins, being carried into the sky by her magical flying umbrella, watched by Prince George and Princess Charlotte. The work is at the entrance to Neal's Yard, off Monmouth Street in Covent Garden, London. In September 2019, around the date of the Global Climate Change protests, a Bambi street art picture appeared on the side of a residential building in Belsize Place, NW3, London. The piece presents an ape holding a placard saying "Save Our Homo-sapiens", David Attenborough and Greta Thunberg holding a placard saying "Skolstrejk för Klimatet" (school strike for the climate).

== History ==
In 2010, the vandalism of Bambi's Make Tea Not War stencil in Primrose Hill renewed debate over the preservation of street art. Islington councillors subsequently proposed establishing a community committee to consider the protection of street art. In early 2011, Bambi commemorated the royal wedding of Prince William and Kate Middleton with the satirical slogan "A Bit Like Marmite" across their chests.

In 2014 Artnet News named Bambi as one of their Top 20 Art World Women of 2014. The list included artist Marina Abramović and singer Beyoncé.

== Controversy ==
In 2014 Bambi produced five shark murals for an Islington pop-up gallery in a building site. Estimated to have been worth over £20,000, the murals were stolen overnight by thieves who climbed over a wall and broke into the redevelopment area. The stolen pieces were going to be sold at auction for the charity Art Against Knives before the robbery took place.
