= Paul Delvaux =

Belgian painter (1897–1994)

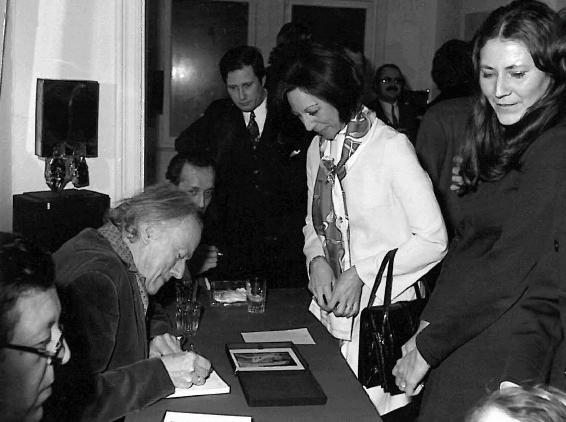
- Paul Delvaux signing autographs (1972), Brussels, Belgium
- Born: 23 September 1897; Antheit, Belgium
- Died: 20 July 1994 (aged 96); Veurne, Belgium
- Education: Académie Royale des Beaux-Arts
- Known for: Painting
- Notable work: Sleeping Venus (1944); Hommage à Jules Verne (1971)
- Spouse(s): Suzanne Purnal (m. 1937, div. 1948); Anne-Marie "Tam" de Maertelaere (m. 1952, d. 1989)

Paul Delvaux (French: [dɛlvo]; 23 September 1897 – 20 July 1994) was a Belgian painter noted for his dream-like scenes of women, classical architecture, trains and train stations, and skeletons, often in combination. He is often considered a surrealist, although he only briefly identified with the surrealist movement. He was influenced by the works of Giorgio de Chirico and René Magritte, but developed his own fantastical subjects and hyper-realistic styling, combining the detailed classical beauty of academic painting with the bizarre juxtapositions of surrealism.

Throughout his long career, Delvaux explored "Nude and skeleton, the clothed and the unclothed, male and female, desire and horror, eroticism and death – Delvaux's major anxieties in fact, and the greater themes of his later work [...]".

== Early life and education ==
Delvaux was born on 23 September 1897 in Antheit (now part of Wanze) in the Belgian province of Liège. His parents lived in Brussels, but his mother went to her own mother's home to have her first child. His birthplace house would later be destroyed by fire, in 1940.

His father was Jean Delvaux, a prosperous barrister at the Court of Appeal in Brussels. His mother was the musician Laure Jamotte, who became a strong, dominant presence in his life, directing, controlling, and repressing his childhood and adolescent desires.

The young Delvaux studied Greek and Latin, and absorbed the fiction of Jules Verne and the poetry of Homer's Odyssey. His artwork was to be greatly influenced by these works, starting with his earliest drawings showing mythological scenes. His music lessons were conducted in the school's museum room, where a human skeleton in a glass cabinet was always present.

From 1910 to 1916, he studied Classics at the Atheneum of Saint-Gilles, where he was a middling or average student. Upon his graduation, his parents got him an office job with a shipping company in Brussels. It was soon evident that he had no skills or interests in business or law, and he was grudgingly allowed to study architecture at the Académie Royale des Beaux-Arts despite his ambition to become a painter.

In 1916, he started at the Académie, initially learning the basics of architecture and perspective drawing. He was then disqualified due to his weakness in mathematics, and dropped out after his first year. Delvaux was worried about his future career, and passed the time by copying postcards. His mother advised him to paint from nature, and in 1919 he produced his first watercolors of some scenic vistas.

On a family vacation in Zeebrugge in 1919, he met by chance the painter Franz Courtens. Upon seeing some of the watercolor landscapes Delvaux had painted, Courtens told the parents, "Your son has talent and has a great future in front of him". Courtens encouraged the failed student to return to the Académie to study painting, and the parents finally acquiesced to this plan.

In 1919, Delvaux returned and studied with decorative painter Constant Montald (a former student of Puvis de Chavannes), and other teachers. The painter Alfred Bastien and symbolist painter Jean Delville also encouraged Delvaux, whose works from this period were primarily naturalistic landscapes. During 1920–1921, he also performed his mandatory military service as a minor logistics clerk, while studying with Delville at the Académie.

== Artistic career ==
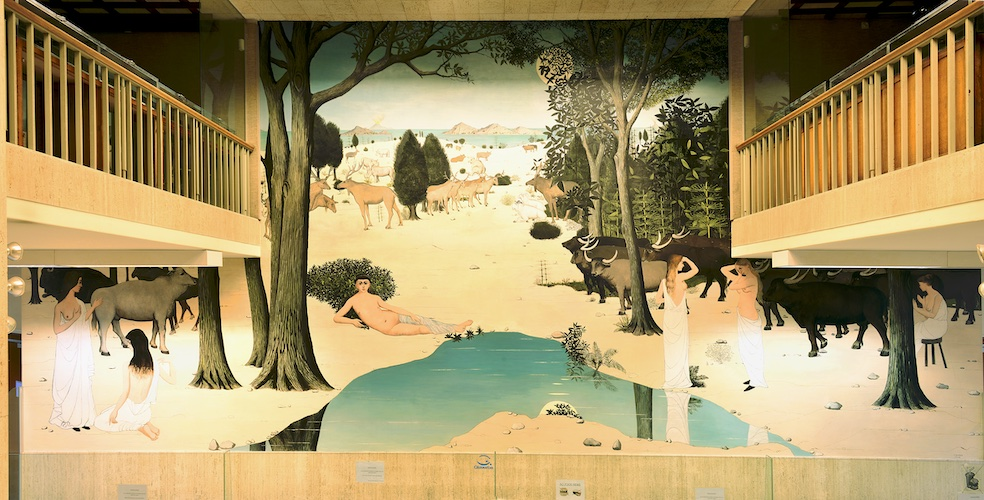
The 1960 mural La Genèse ("Genesis") in Liège

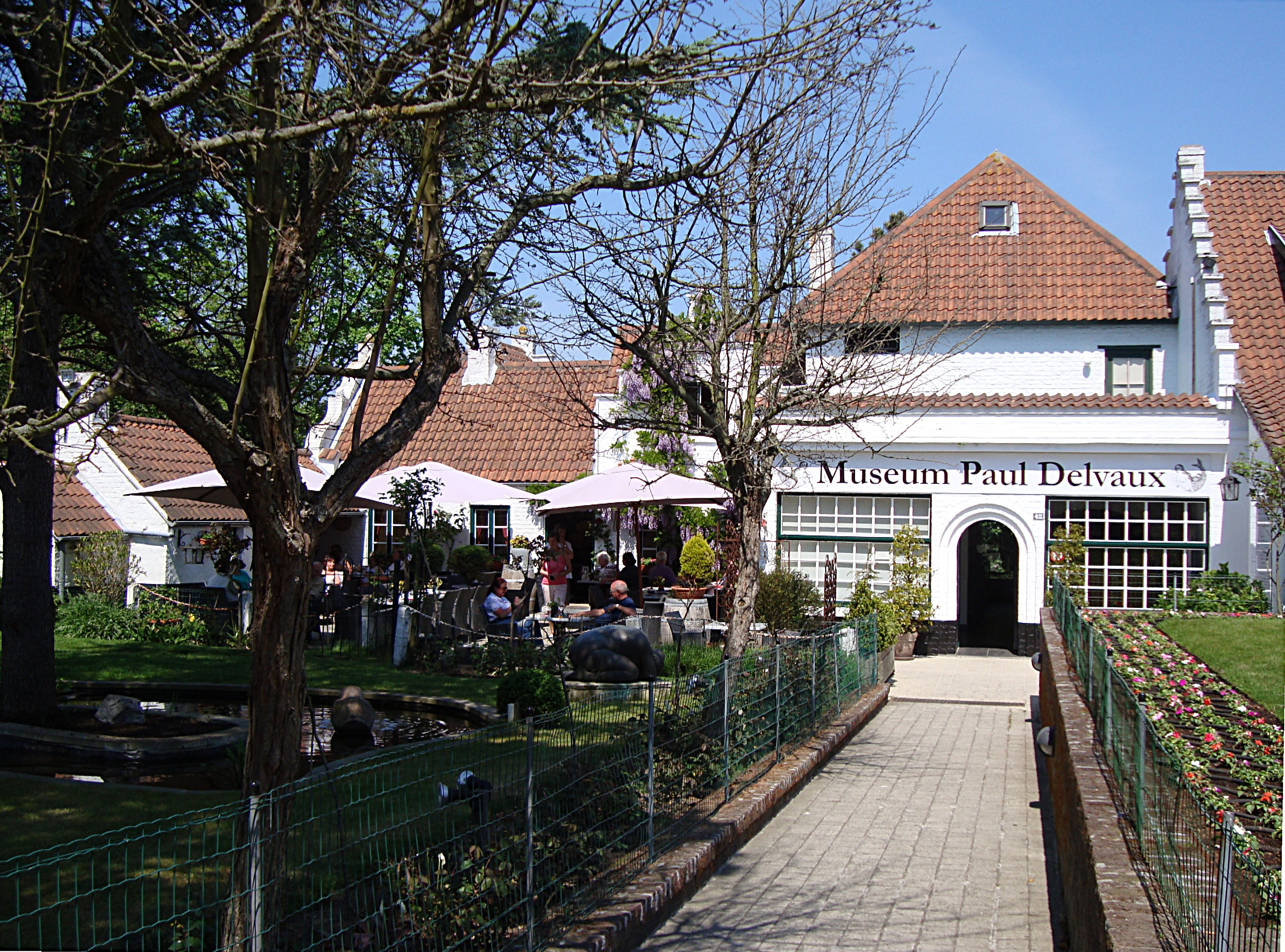
The Paul Delvaux Museum in Saint-Idesbald, Belgium

Initially, Delvaux was influenced by the style of 19th-century French and Belgian academic painting as represented by Jean Auguste Dominique Ingres or Puvis de Chavannes. Delvaux completed some 80 paintings between 1920 and 1925. His early paintings were mostly post-impressionist, somber landscapes, but also included dark, gritty urban scenes, such as Les cheminots de la gare du Luxembourg ("Railroad Workers of Luxembourg Station", 1922).

In 1924, he set up a studio in his parents' house, at 15 Rue Ecosse (Schotlandstraat), Brussels. In 1925, he had his first solo exhibition, in Brussels.

Delvaux's paintings of the late 1920s and early 1930s began to feature nudes in landscapes, and were strongly influenced by such Flemish Expressionists as Constant Permeke, Gustave De Smet, Frits Van den Berghe, and the palette colors of James Ensor. His nude figures and portraits from this period are posed somewhat stiffly, whether outdoors or in domestic surroundings indoors. Relatively few of his paintings from the late 1920s have survived, and Delvaux recorded his destruction of 50 of his canvases to re-use the frames.

In 1929, Delvaux first met Anne-Marie de Maertelaere, whom he nicknamed "Tam", and they fell in love. However, his domineering mother forced him to separate from Tam, exacting his promise to never see her again. Delvaux was greatly saddened by this, and his paintings took on a more isolated, lonely, detached tone.

In 1932, Delvaux found fresh inspiration in visits to the Midi Fair (Foire du Midi) in Brussels, where the Spitzner Museum (Musée Spitzner), a collection of medical curiosities, displayed wax models of bizarrely deformed anatomical specimens and diseases, including syphilis. The exhibit also maintained a booth in which skeletons and a mechanically breathing Venus figure were displayed in a window with red velvet curtains. This spectacle fascinated Delvaux, supplying him with some of the motifs that would appear throughout his subsequent work.

His mother died on 31 December 1932.

A change of style around 1933 reflected the influence of the metaphysical art of Giorgio de Chirico, which he had first encountered in 1926 or 1927. Delvaux women wear elaborate costumes or are semi-nude, in scenes of classical ruins or dark forests.

In the mid-1930s Delvaux also began to adopt some of the motifs of his fellow Belgian René Magritte, as well as that painter's deadpan style in rendering the most unexpected juxtapositions of otherwise ordinary objects. Delvaux would maintain a respectful but uneasy relationship with Magritte, who was his almost-exact contemporary. He also admired the work of his younger contemporary, Balthus.

Delvaux acknowledged his influences, saying of de Chirico, "with him I realized what was possible, the climate that had to be developed, the climate of silent streets with shadows of people who can't be seen, I've never asked myself if it's surrealist or not."

In 1934, Delvaux joined Salvador Dalí, de Chirico, and Magritte in an exhibition entitled Minotaure, at the Palais des Beaux-Arts de Bruxelles. In 1936, he and Magritte had separate shows at the Palais, which received favorable reviews.

Although Delvaux associated for a period with the Belgian surrealist group, he did not consider himself "a Surrealist in the scholastic sense of the word." As Marc Rombaut has written of the artist: "Delvaux ... always maintained an intimate and privileged relationship to his childhood, which is the underlying motivation for his work and always manages to surface there. This 'childhood,' existing within him, led him to the poetic dimension in art."

On 16 January 1937, his father died. In July that year, Delvaux married Suzanne Purnal; the artist later said it was purely a marriage of convenience. He made his first trip to Italy, and would return there the next year. Mermaids and ocean surfside scenes started to appear among his paintings.

Delvaux perfected his mature artistic style between 1937 and 1941, reflecting both his sublimated desires and the increasing anxiety of the times. The artist's own continuing awkward presence in his paintings, along with skeletons and various male characters from Jules Verne novels, were a counterpoint to his idealized female nudes, who gradually became more relaxed in their elegant beauty.

When the Germans invaded and occupied Belgium in 1940, Delvaux retreated to Pas-de-Calais with his aunts for eight days, but then returned to Brussels. He spent the war years quietly at home continuing to paint, but exhibiting nothing in Belgium. His painting La ville inquiète ("The Anxious City", 1941) reflects both the chaotic worries and the uncanny everyday routine of his environment.

Delvaux frequently visited the Museum of Natural Sciences in Brussels to sketch human skeletons. In 1943, Delvaux finished the first of what would become a series of articulated skeletons in his paintings, posed in lifelike stances and interacting with other skeletons or occasionally with nude women.

In the post-war years, Delvaux continued the productive period he had started under the German occupation, painting many works that would later establish his reputation.

In January 1945, Delvaux had a major retrospective show at the Palais des Beaux-Arts, including 57 large-scale canvases. "Public and critical reception was mixed, divided between admiration and incomprehension."

In 1946, he experimented briefly with exaggerated perspectives and a flattened picture plane, as shown in Les cariatides ("Caryatids") and La ville noire ("Black City").

In 1947, the influential Julien Levy Gallery in New York City mounted a show of Delvaux paintings, which was well received by critics. However, two of his paintings had been seized by customs as obscene, and one of them was damaged.

In August 1947, Delvaux again met Tam in a chance encounter at a newsstand in Saint-Idesbald, and they resumed their close relationship. The next year, Delvaux divorced his first wife Suzanne and moved to a temporary new home with Tam. In 1951, the reunited couple built a small house/studio in the coastal dunes of Saint-Idesbald. The pair married on 25 October 1952, and would be inseparable for many years until Tam's death in 1989.

In 1949, Delvaux experimented with tempera to paint a mermaid on the front of a friend's house in Saint-Idesbald. However, since then the fresco has been largely erased by the effects of weathering.

From 1950 to 1962, Delvaux served as professor of "monumental painting" at the École Nationale Supérieure d'Arts et d'Architecture de La Cambre, Brussels. In the 1950s, he painted a series of crucifixions and deposition scenes enacted by skeletons. Some of his paintings from this period are almost monochromatic, showing more concern for line than for color.

In the late 1950s, he turned temporarily from painting nudes to producing a number of night scenes in which trains are observed by a little girl in a dress, viewed from behind. These compositions contained nothing overtly surrealistic, yet the unnatural clarity of moonlit detail is hallucinatory in effect. Trains had always been a subject of special interest to Delvaux, who never forgot the wonder he felt as a small child at the sight of the first electric trams in Brussels.

In 1952, Delvaux collaborated with Emile Salkin and three students from La Cambre to produce a wall mural at the gaming room in the Ostend Kursaal, portraying a Roman-style classical dancing scene with a large mermaid in a prone posture. In 1954–1956 Delvaux collaborated with Salkin for a series of wall panels at the house of Gilbert Périer in Brussels. They portrayed women in either contemporary or classical costume in Greco-Roman architectural settings, contrasting with one panel depicting an all-male dining table scene.

In 1954, Delvaux joined the 27th Venice Biennale, whose theme that year was "Fantasy in Art". He exhibited his paintings of religious scenes enacted by skeletons, but the show was censored for heresy by Cardinal Roncalli (who would later become Pope John XXIII).

In 1956 Delvaux visited Greece, where classical architecture originated, the land of Homer and the Odyssey. He also visited Italy, reinforcing his favored themes of classical settings and costumes.

In 1958, Delvaux led a team of La Cambre students in painting La Carte littéraire de Belgique ("Literary Map of Belgium") for the 1958 Brussels World’s Fair (Expo 58). It was a 3-by-5-metre (9.8 ft × 16.4 ft) oil painting, depicting a map of Belgium and the locations where writers associated with the country were born, lived, or worked, including foreign authors such as Charlotte Brontë. The map shows various sites in Belgium's towns and cities, and is decorated with flute players and mermaids painted by Delvaux. In 1976, Delvaux attended the formal transfer of the painting to a lecture hall at the Archives et Musée de la littérature (part of the Royal Library of Belgium) in Brussels, where it remains publicly visible today.

In 1959 Delvaux collaborated with Ysette Gabriels and Charles Van Deun to paint Le paradis terrestre ("Earthly Paradise"), a 42-by-4.5-metre (138 ft × 15 ft) mural at the Palais des Congrès in Brussels (now part of the Square – Brussels Meeting Centre). It foregrounded women in classical garb outside a Roman-style villa, while in the far background (upper reaches of the mural) the figures were nude. The mural has been preserved and restored, but is located in an area now infrequently visible to the public. In 1960, he again worked with Gabriels to paint the mural La Genèse ("Genesis") at the University of Liège Institute of Zoology (now l'Aquarium-Muséum de Liège or Dubuisson Aquarium). It shows a pastoral scene with grazing animals, female classical figures, and an androgynous reclining nude.

In 1963 he was named vice-director of the Académie Royale de Belgique, and then promoted to be its president in 1965.

In 1966, Delvaux began working with the 22-year-old model Danielle Caneel, using her slim figure as inspiration over the next 17 years in numerous drawings and studies. With a few exceptions, he did not depict her face or cropped brunette hair in his finished paintings, preferring to substitute idealized symmetrical facial features and long blonde hair. The 1960s and 1970s were a period of high productivity for his paintings, and also increasing international recognition of his art.

In 1969, Delvaux moved to Veurne (also called Furnes), but still spent much of his time at his studio in nearby Saint-Idesbald.

In the 1970s and 1980s, Delvaux's eyesight gradually deteriorated. His brushwork became less precise and more impressionistic, and his colors became brighter and more vivid. His work became "less anxious, quieter, and more meditative". His later paintings shed their longtime motifs, and focused increasingly on the female figure, often in multiples, and now interacting with each other more than the detached figures of earlier paintings. These paintings have been compared to the works of Odilon Redon and Marc Chagall.

In 1974, Delvaux, with assistance of Raymond Art, Fernand Flausch, Alain Denis, and M Huysmans, painted Le Voyage Légendaire ("Legendary Voyage"), measuring 4.4-by-13-metre (14 ft × 43 ft). Originally installed at the Casino de Chaudfontaine, it was later moved to the Casino de Knokke-le-Zoute. It shows a surreal outdoors panorama, depicting "the cave, the thick forest, the naked or dressed girls, the trains and tracks meticulously illustrated in the small station, the lights and electricity poles, the moon, the mailbox".

In 1978, he collaborated with Raymond Art and Charles Van Deun to paint the monumental fresco wall mural Nos vieux trams bruxellois ("Our Old Brussels Trams") in the Bourse-Beurs Brussels Metro station.

That same year, the Paul Delvaux Foundation was created with the approval of the King of Belgium; its primary goal was to create a museum dedicated to the artist. Tam's health was starting to decline, but she wrote a note encouraging her husband to continue creating art for as long as he was able to.

In 1981, Delvaux met Andy Warhol in Brussels, who made several portraits of the aging artist. With the approval of the artist, Charles Van Deun purchased an old hotel/restaurant, Het Vlierhof, in Saint-Idesbald, to house the new museum.

On 26 June 1982, the Paul Delvaux Museum (French: Musée Paul Delvaux) opened, with the artist and his wife in attendance. The museum has acquired the world's largest collection of paintings, watercolors, drawings, sketchbooks, and prints by Delvaux.

In 1984, Delvaux was appointed Chef de gare d'honneur de Louvain-La-Neuve (honorary stationmaster). Delvaux and Tam moved to a large house in Veurne. He visited his museum almost daily, and continued to create art, transitioning more to pencil, ink, and watercolor.

In 1986, Delvaux painted his last canvas, entitled Calypso.

In 1988, Delvaux left his studio in Saint-Idesbald to spend more time at home in Veurne with his ailing wife. He continued to make drawings, often at large scale, so he could still work on them despite his failing eyesight.

Tam died on 21 December 1989. At this point Delvaux completely abandoned creating artworks. He died in Veurne on 20 July 1994, and was buried there next to his beloved wife.

== Style and themes ==
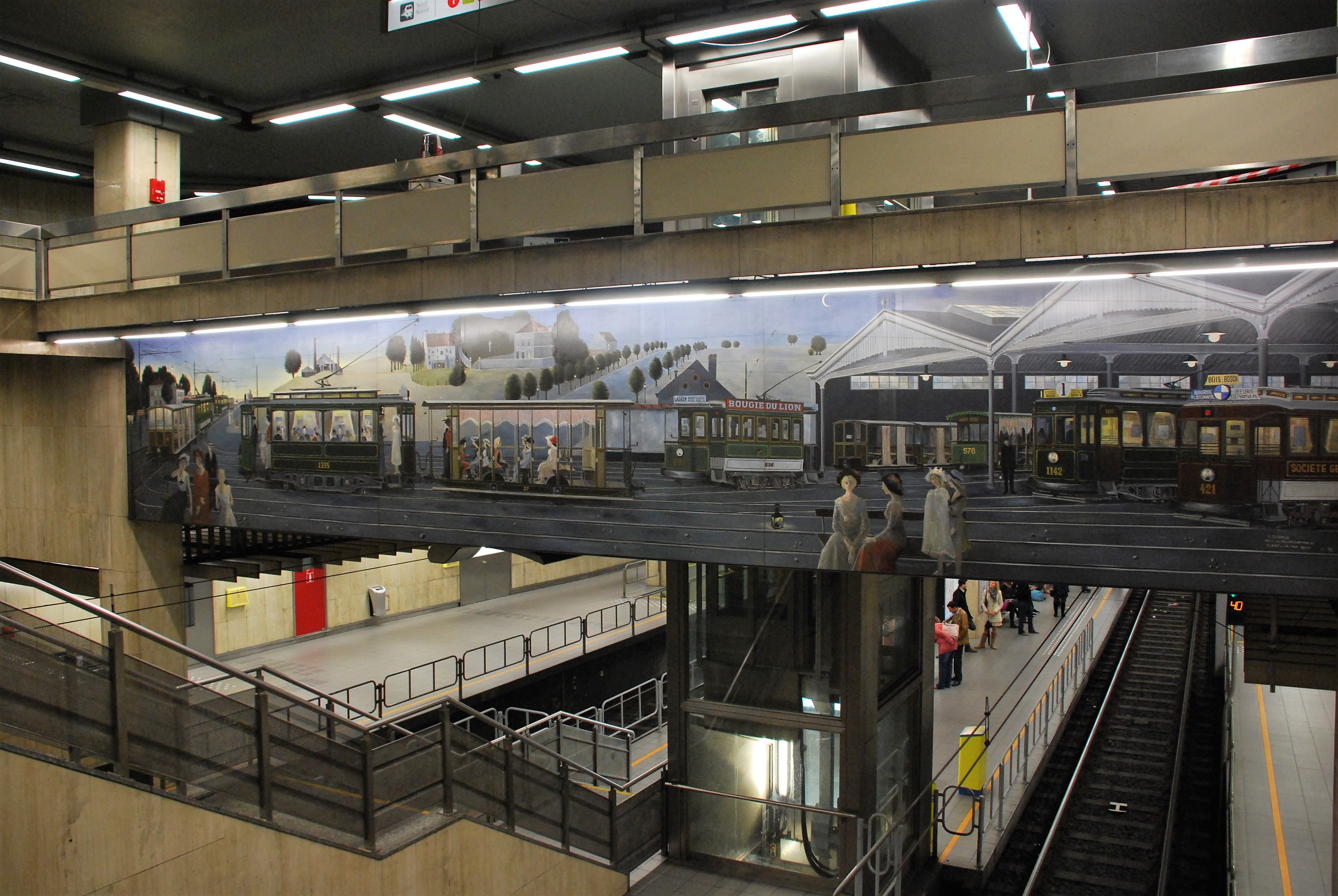
Delvaux collaborated on this 1978 mural depicting old-fashioned trams and their passengers in the Bourse-Beurs Brussels Metro station

Delvaux usually painted very meticulously and deliberately, after doing numerous preparatory studies and drawings sometimes numbering in the dozens. In addition to these systematic studies, he also made a lesser number of "spontaneous" drawings as independent artworks, more expressive and improvisational in quality. Once he actually had started a major painting, he continued to modify his layout, erasing, moving, or replacing different elements to perfect his artwork. Over a long 60-year career, his perfectionism allowed him to release only around 450 paintings.

Delvaux became famous for paintings usually featuring one or several nude or semi-nude women who gaze languidly into space as if hypnotized, gesturing mysteriously, sometimes reclining incongruously in a train station or wandering through classical buildings. Sometimes they are accompanied by skeletons, businessmen in bowler hats, or puzzled scientists drawn from the stories of Jules Verne.

The settings are often commonplace moonlit urban scenes or classical ruins, depicting absurdist tableaus with a dream-like precision clarity. Delvaux sometimes would place himself in the scene, appearing either nude or fully-dressed in a business suit. Elements that appear frequently include mirrors, the full or crescent moon, candles, books, and flute players.

Delvaux would repeat variations on these themes for most of his long career, although some departures can be noted. Among them are his paintings of 1945–1947, rendered in a flattened style with distorted and forced perspective effects. At that time, he had felt trapped in a loveless marriage.

The gaze of the viewer is central to his paintings, often modulated by unusual viewpoints and multiple vanishing points, windows or openings, and mirrors. The perspectives are sometimes delineated by telegraph wires or steel rails crisscrossing or converging in the distance. Lines, whether straight and man-made, or the curved contours of the body, are often more important than the muted color palette.

In contrast to the cool, isolated detachment of his painted figures, Delvaux's smaller drawings and sketches more frequently show figures touching, embracing, and interacting closely with each other.

Throughout the mature Delvaux artworks, certain motifs appear repeatedly:

- Trains, Trams, and Stations – Although replaced by electric trains, old-fashioned steam locomotives and rolling stock recur often. Longtime friend Paul-Aloïse De Bock commented on Delvaux's thorough knowledge of the development of the Brussels tramway system, from his childhood's horse-drawn trolleys to contemporary electric models, including details of tram bodywork and trackwork.
- Architectural Elements – Ancient Greek or Roman buildings, ruins, and architectural fragments appear, as well as early 20th-century urban structures.
- A Tribute to Women – Delvaux women are omnipresent in his work, but are disengaged and remote from the viewer, their expressionless gaze and focus elsewhere. They are usually nude or semi-nude, often adorned with gauze, feathers, floral headpieces, or elaborate jewelry. His future wife Tam appears repeatedly in sketches and drawings starting in the 1930s, but is replaced by more generic faces after their reunion and marriage in 1952.
- The Place of Men – Delvaux men often appear absent-minded, old-fashioned, or even ridiculous. Due to the lack of a convenient model, the artist often portrayed himself for male nudes. Other characters include the "ordinary man in the street" in a business suit, and the geologist (Otto Lidenbrock) and astronomer (Palmyrin Rosette) from novels by Jules Verne. After 1943, male figures appear infrequently, but his classic male archetypes reappear in his reprised masterwork Hommage à Jules Verne ("Homage to Jules Verne", 1971).
- Skeletons as Architecture of Life – Delvaux paradoxically uses human skeletons as an affirmation of life, sometimes posing them more expressively than his dispassionate nudes.

== Honours ==
- 1958: Member of the Royal Academy of Science, Letters and Fine Arts of Belgium.

== See also ==
- List of Belgian painters
