= Chelouche =

Chelouche is a surname. Notable people with the surname include:

- Aharon Chelouche, co-founder of Neve Tzedek, now part of Tel Aviv
- Aviezer Chelouche, Israeli diplomat
- Moshe Chelouche, Mayor of Tel Aviv
- Yoav Chelouche, Israeli businessman
- Yosef Eliyahu Chelouche, co-founder of Tel Aviv, entrepreneur, businessman and industrialist
