= Nachum Gutman =

Moldovan-born Israeli artist (1898–1980)

Nachum Gutman נחום גוטמן
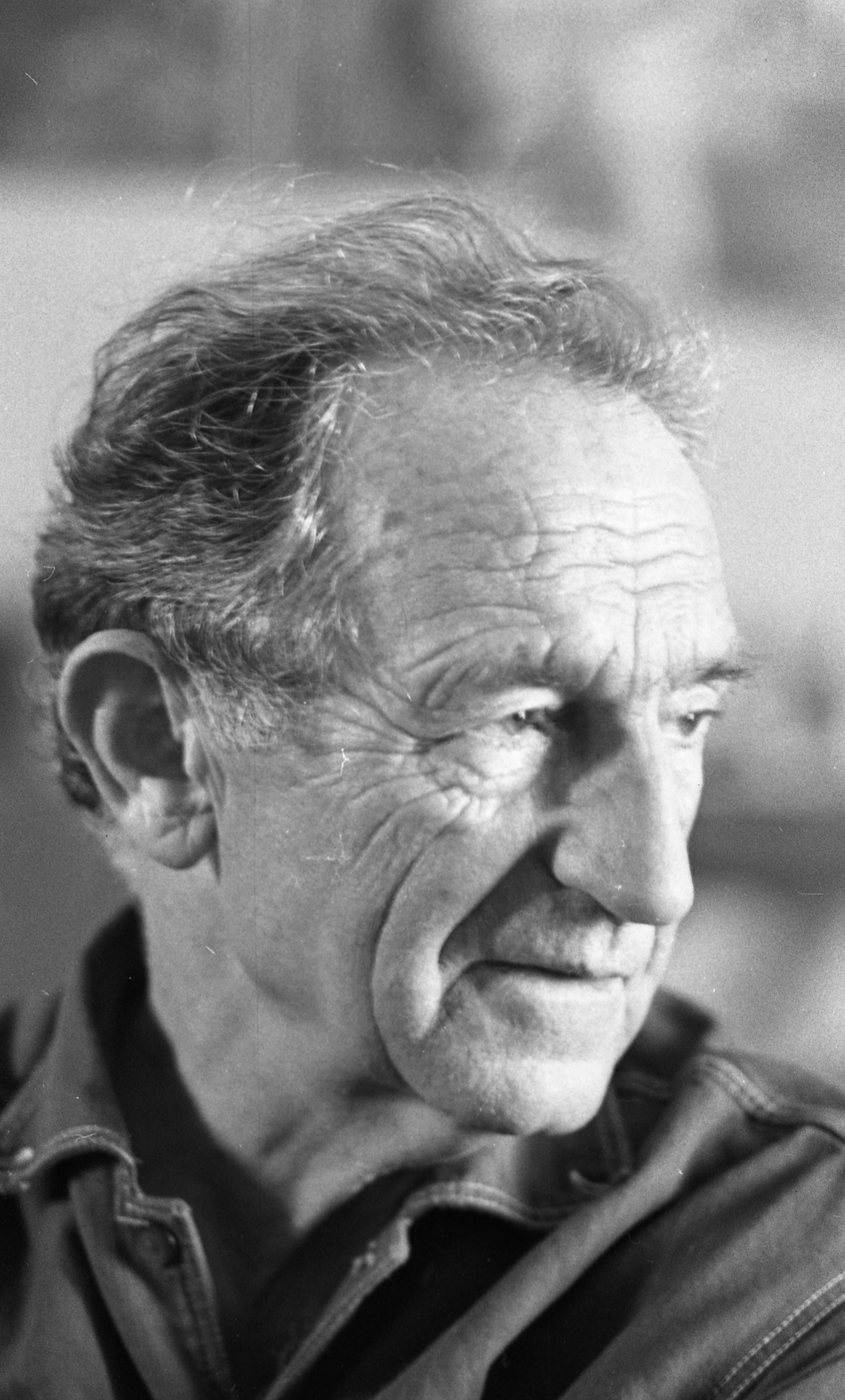
- Gutman in 1920
- Born: October 5, 1898; Teleneşti, Bessarabia Governorate, Russian Empire
- Died: November 28, 1980 (aged 82)
- Education: Bezalel Academy of Arts and Design
- Known for: Painting
- Spouse: Dora Yaffe (m. 1928)
- Children: Menachem "Hemi" Gutman
- Awards: Dizengoff Prize, Lamdan Prize, Israel Prize

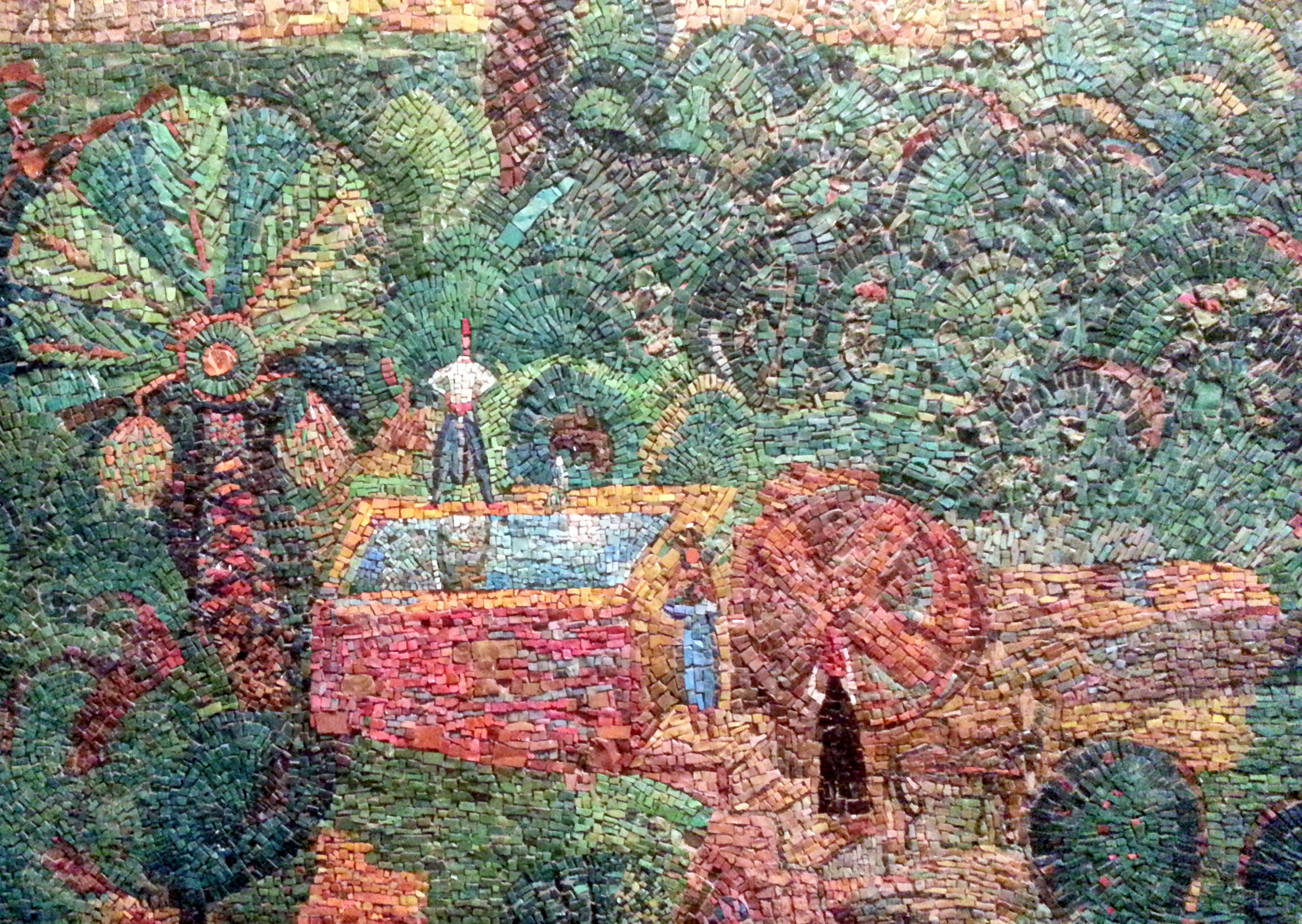
Nachum Gutman mosaic wall at Shalom Tower, where the old Herzliya Gymnasium once stood; detail showing orchards and a saqiya fountain outside old Jaffa

Nachum Gutman (as he himself signed; alternate romanisation: Nahum Gutman; Hebrew: נחום גוטמן; October 5, 1898 – November 28, 1980) was a Moldovan-born Israeli painter, sculptor, and author.

== Early life and education ==
Nachum Gutman was born in Teleneşti, Bessarabia Governorate, then a part of the Russian Empire (now in the Republic of Moldova). He was the fourth child of Sim[c]ha Alter and Rivka Gutman. His father was a Hebrew writer and educator who wrote under the pen name S. Ben Zion.

In 1903, the family moved to Odessa, where his father taught at a “Cheder Ha’metukan”, where the language of instruction of Modern Hebrew rather than Yiddish. The poet, Chaim Nachman Bialik visited the school and spent time with Nachman, recognising his talent for painting.

Two year later, the family emigrated to Ottoman Palestine. His father taught at the Hebrew School for Girls in Neve Tzedek.

In 1908, Gutman attended the Herzliya Gymnasium in what would later become Tel Aviv. In 1912, he studied at the Bezalel School in Jerusalem He enlisted as a volunteer in the Jewish Legion in 1918. In 1920–26, he studied art in Vienna, Berlin and Paris.

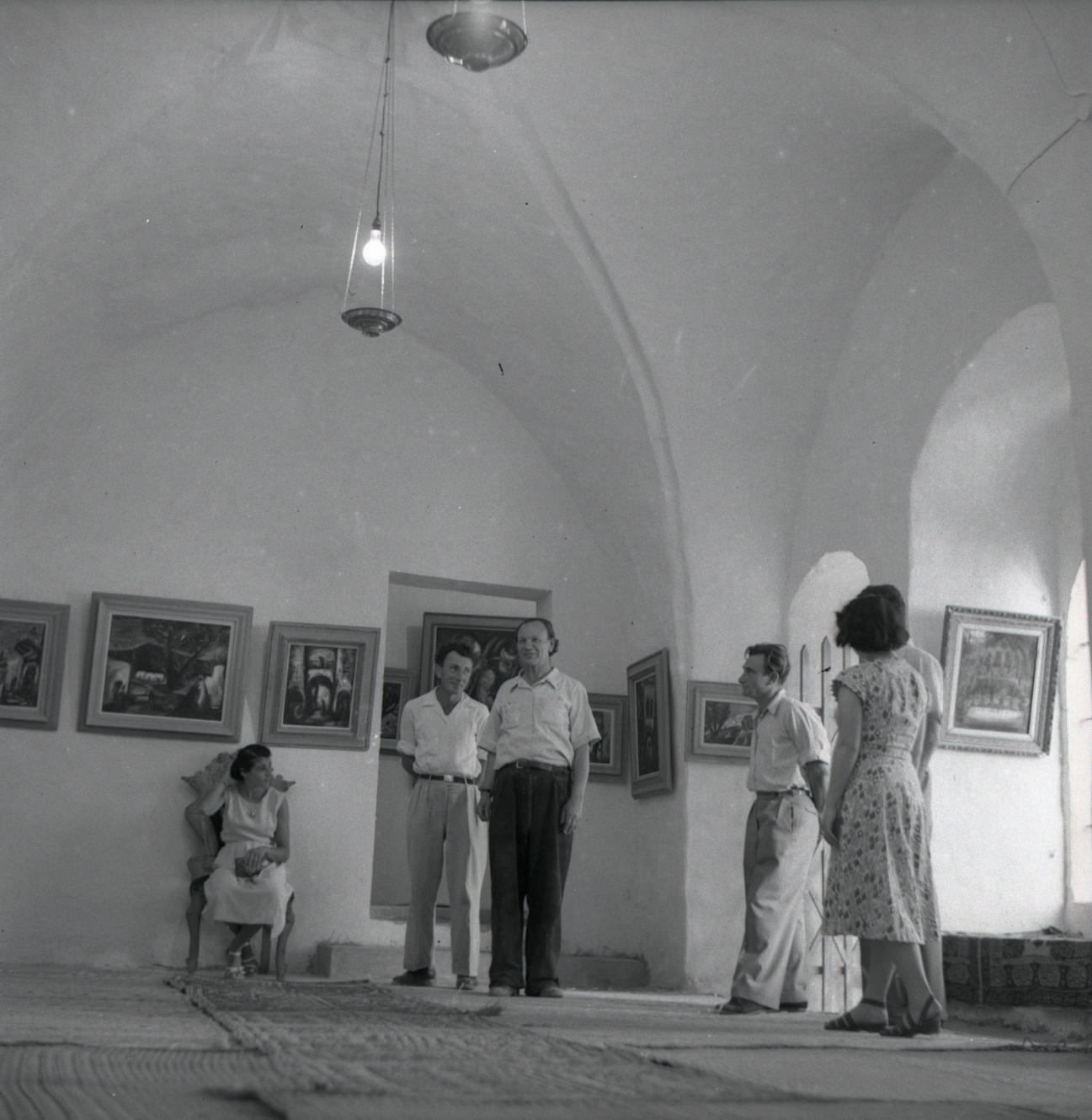
Nahum Gutman, (the man to the right) at Yitzhak Frenkel's (standing in the center) home in Safed

== Artistic career ==
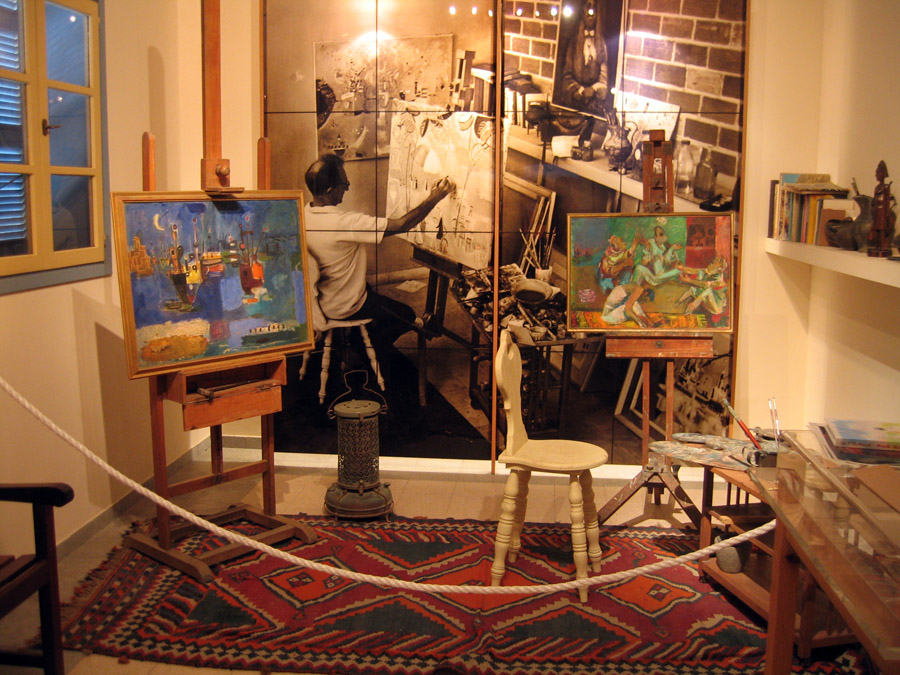
Gutman's studio, Nahum Gutman Museum of Art

Gutman helped pioneer a distinctively Israeli style, moving away from the European influences of his teachers. He worked in many different media: oils, watercolours, gouache and pen and ink.

His sculptures and brightly colored mosaics can be seen in public places around Tel Aviv. Indoor murals depicting the history of Tel Aviv can be seen in the western wing of the Shalom Tower and the Chief Rabbinate building.

A mosaic fountain with scenes from the early days of Tel Aviv and biblical stories connected to Jaffa (inscribed with 3 Bible verses: Jeremiah 31:4, 2 Chronicles 2:16, Jonah 1:3), stood for 32 years at the end of Bialik Street, opposite the old Tel Aviv municipality building. In 2012 this mosaic fountain was reinstalled at the southern end of Rothschild Boulevard.

Gutman's artistic style was eclectic, ranging from figurative to abstract. Gutman was also a well-known writer and illustrator of children's books.

In 1979, his work was featured as part of the exhibition, "Israel the Dream", held across seven floors of the flagship department store, Bloomingdale's in Manhattan.

== Awards and recognition ==
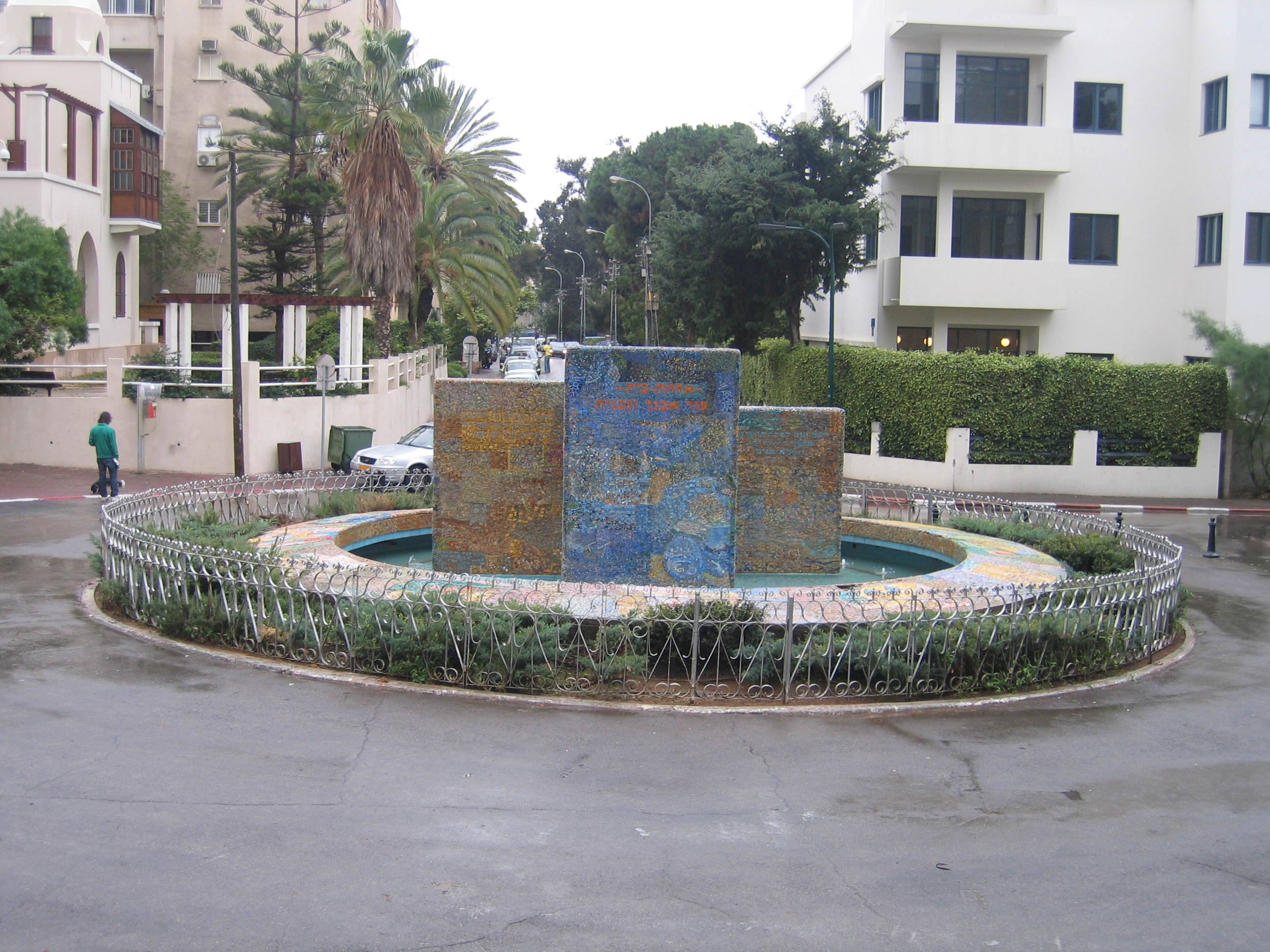
Rear side of mosaic fountain by Gutman at its original location (1976-2008) at Bialik Square, Tel Aviv

Gutman received many art and literary prizes:

- 1938: Dizengoff Prize for painting (also in 1956)
- 1946: Lamdan Prize for children's literature
- 1955: Sicily Award for watercolor painting at the São Paulo Biennale
- 1956: Dizengoff Prize for painting (also in 1938)
- 1962: Hans Christian Andersen Literary Prize on behalf of Unesco for his book "Path of Orange Peels"
- 1964: Yatziv Prize
- 1969: Fichman Prize for Literature and Art
- 1974: Honorary Doctor of Philosophy from Tel Aviv University
- 1976: Honorary Citizen of Tel Aviv
- 1978: Israel Prize, for children's literature

The Nachum Gutman Museum, showcasing the artist's work, was established in the Neve Tzedek neighborhood of Tel Aviv.

== Outdoor and public art ==
- 1961 A mosaic wall at the Chief Rabbinate building, Tel Aviv
- 1966 A mosaic wall in memory of the Herzliya high school at Migdal Shalom (Shalom Tower), Tel Aviv
- 1976 History of Jaffa and Tel Aviv, mosaic-decorated fountain, initially Bialik Square, now southern end of Rothschild Boulevard Tel Aviv

== Published works ==
- Path of the Orange Peels: Adventures in the Early Days of Tel Aviv (English translation: Nelly Segal) Dodd, Mead & Company, 1979
- "Seven Mills and Another Station" (Sheva T'khanot ve'od Takhana), Yavneh 1956
- "In the Land of Lobengulu King of Zulu", Massadah 1940

== Personal life ==
In 1928, Gutman married Dora Yaffe, with whom he had a son, Menachem "Hemi" Gutman.

=== Death ===
Gutman died in Tel Aviv at the age of 82 on November 28th, 1980. Shortly before his death, he told his life story to the writer and researcher, Ehud Ben Ezer, who later published the story as “Between Sand Dunes and Blue sky” (Bein Cholot Ve-Kchol Shamayim).

After Gutman's death, Dora asked two Tel Aviv gallery owners, Meir Stern of Stern Gallery and Miriam Tawin of Shulamit Gallery, to appraise the value all of the works left in his estate.

== Legacy ==
In 2010, three decades after his death, Haaretz newspaper published English translations of previously unpublished original writings by Gutman, drawing mostly from the Gnazim Institute. In Haaretz, Benny Ziffer wrote: "There is no doubt that the writings from the estate, a few selections from which appear on these pages in English translation, are helping to change the perspective we have on Gutman as the painter of the first Hebrew city. Gutman also responded to places outside Tel Aviv, as in the elegiac essay, published on these pages for the first time, about the uprooting of an olive grove in Ramle. The fresh writing and the so very vigorous and contemporary Hebrew of the extracts from the estate presented here are also not to be taken for granted."

In 2011, Gutman's former alma mater, Bezalel Academy of Arts and Design staged an exhibition, "What Does It Mean to Interpret a Tradition?", conceived as an homage to Gutman.

== See also ==
- List of Israel Prize recipients
- Neve Tsedek
- Eden Cinema
- Aaron Chelouche
