= Nahum Gutman Museum of Art =

Art museum in Tel Aviv, Israel

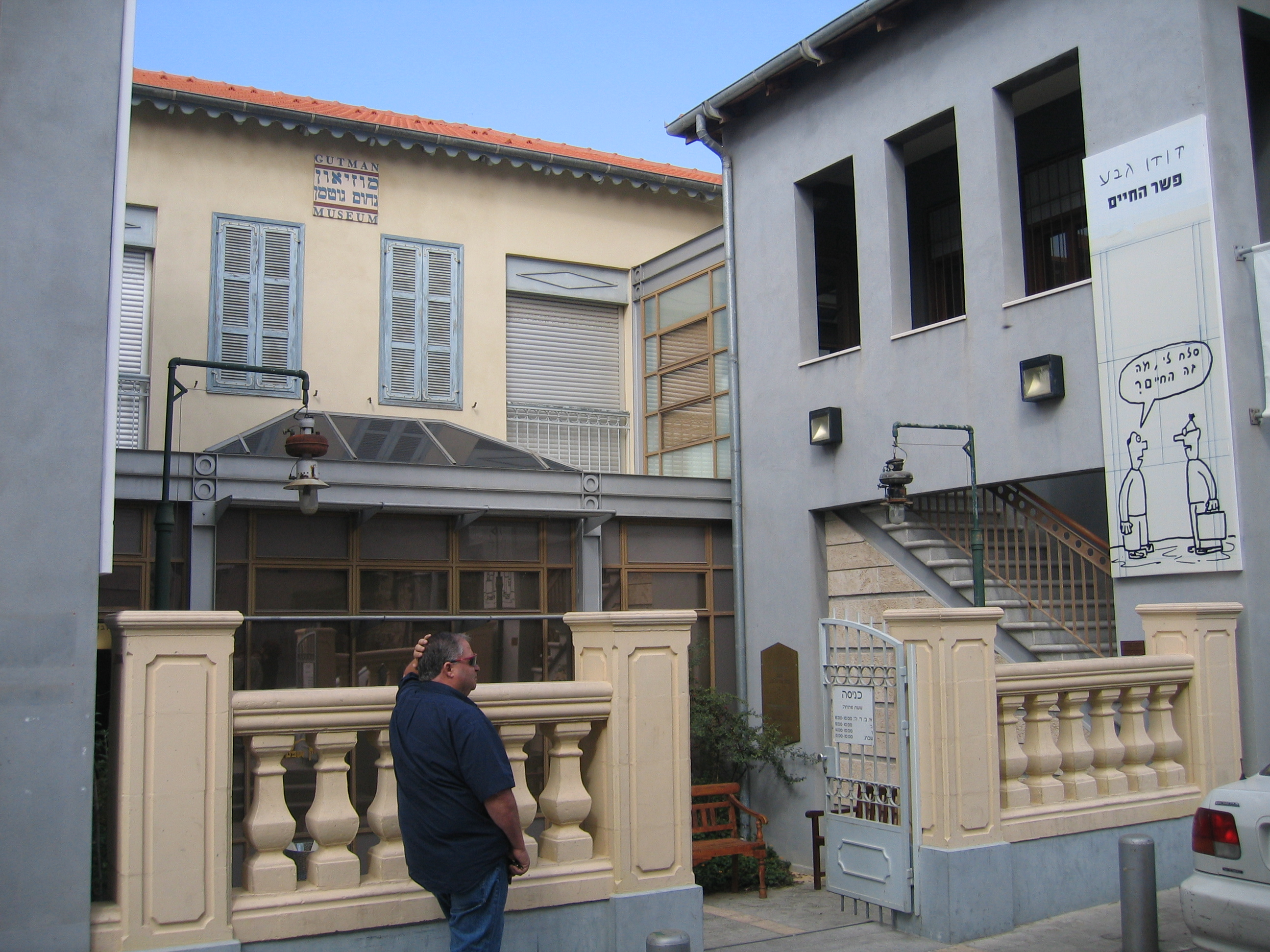
- Established: 1998
- Location: Shim'on Rokach 21, Neve Tzedek, Tel Aviv
- Coordinates: 32.0608°N 34.7667°E
- Type: Art
- Director: Tali Tamir
- Website: www.gutmanmuseum.co.il

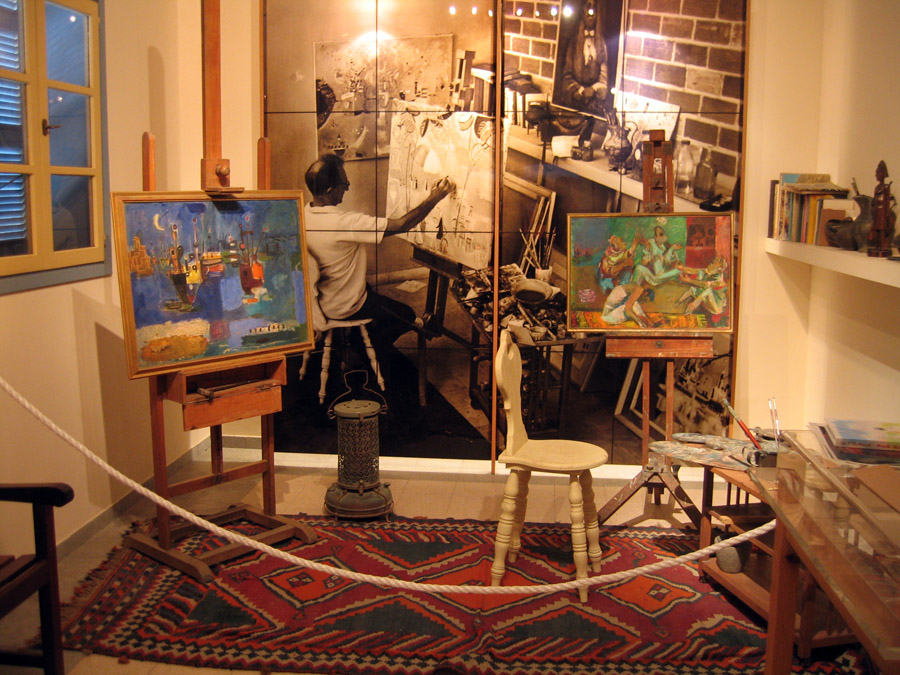
Nahum Gutman's studio

The Nahum Gutman Museum of Art is an art museum located in Neve Tzedek, Tel Aviv, Israel.

== Operations ==
The Museum resides in the historical Writers' Home, which was built in 1887 and was one of the first buildings in the Neve Tzedek neighborhood. Between 1907 and 1914 the building served as HaPoel HaTzair Newspaper's hub.

The building's name arose as the place was home to several authors, including Devorah Baron, Yosef Aharonovich, Asher Beresh, Yehuda Burla, and more. During World War I the building stopped serving the purpose of housing authors, and became an ordinary residence until it was abandoned in the 1960s.

In 1992, after the inclusion of the building in the Tel Aviv Building Preservation Program, the building underwent renovation by the architect Roni Zaibert. The museum was opened in May 1998, and the artwork was donated by Nahum Gutman's family, who had wanted to perpetuate his works.

Many items from Nahum Gutman's studio were also donated, and the studio was recreated in one of the museum's rooms. The museum's first director was the curator Yoav Dagon, and today the head curator is Tali Tamir and the museum's director Roni Disenchik.

In September 2009 a new art exhibition division was opened, named after Mori and Ireen Pargament, as well as an events' hall for up to 70 people and a new gift store. The exhibitions at the museum bring together Nahum Gutman's works with other artists working in the field of contemporary art, and create dialogues between different eras and different perspectives.

In 2013, board member and lawyer Yitzhak Shviger resigned, claiming that the foundation had become "a stage for Palestinian propaganda".

== See also ==
- List of single-artist museums
- Art in Tel Aviv
