= Uzda rural council =

Subdivision of Belarus

Uzda rural council is a lower-level subdivision (selsoviet) of Uzda district, Minsk region, Belarus. Its administrative center is Uzda.
