= Yoav Chelouche =

Israeli businessman

- יואב שלוש
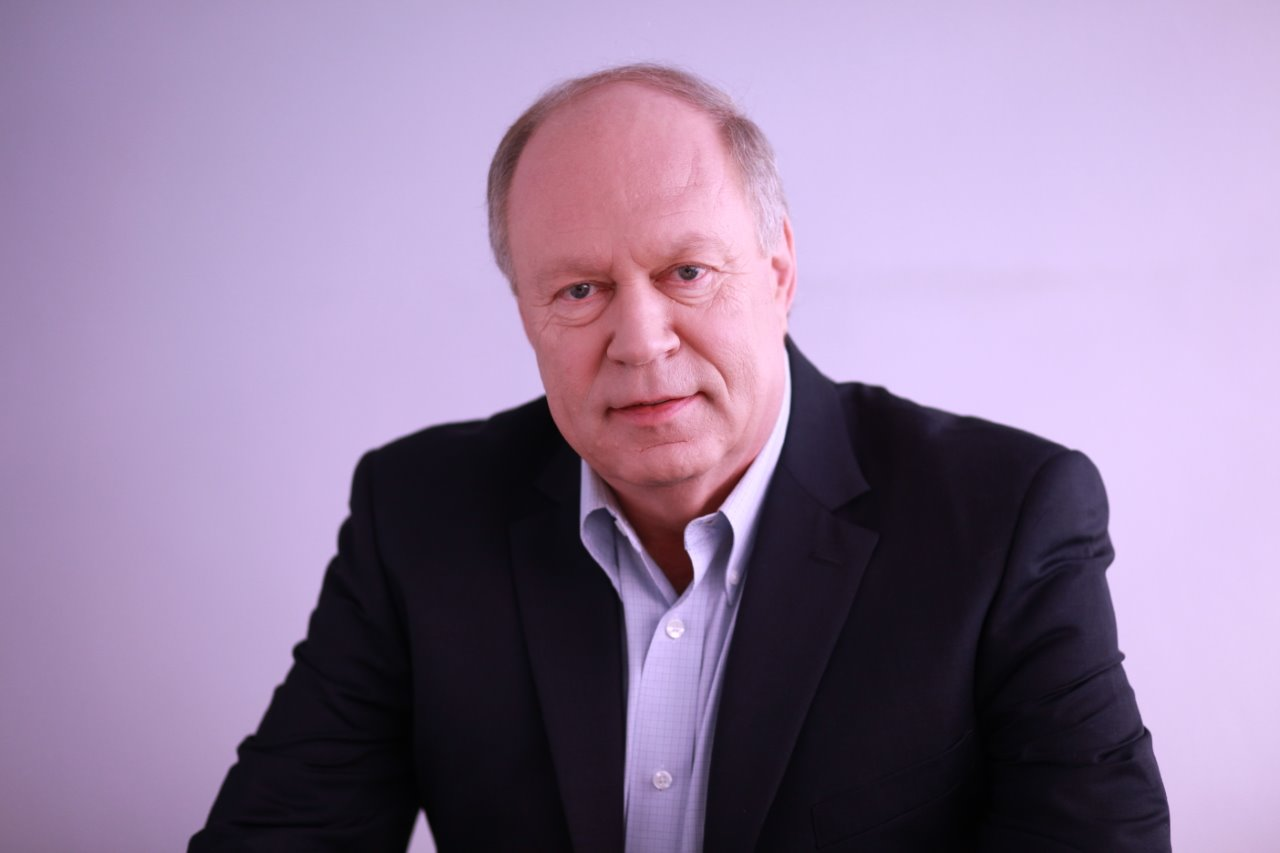
- Born: Paris
- Education: INSEAD
- Occupations: Entrepreneur, Venture Capitalist

Yoav Z. Chelouche (Hebrew: יואב שלוש) is an Israeli businessman, a managing partner of Tel Aviv-based venture capital firm Aviv Venture Capital. From 1995 to 2001, Chelouche was CEO and president of Scitex Corporation. He is on the board of directors of the Tel Aviv Stock Exchange (TASE), Tower Semiconductor (Towerjazz) and Check Point Software Technologies, and was co-chairman of Israel Advanced Technology Industries (IATI).

== Biography ==
Yoav Z. Chelouche was born in Paris to Rachel and Aviezer Chelouche, a diplomat and one of Israel's first ambassadors to Europe. His grandfather, Yosef Eliyahu Chelouche, was the founder of Neve Tzedek, the first Jewish settlement outside Jaffa. His great grandfather, Aharon Chelouche, was one of the early founders of Tel Aviv and the builder of Gymnasia Herzliya, the first Hebrew high school in Palestine. After graduating from Gymnasia Rehavia in Jerusalem, Chelouche served in the Intelligence Corps of the Israel Defense Forces. In 1974, he earned a BA in Economics and Statistics from Tel Aviv University, followed by an MBA from INSEAD business school in Fontainebleau, France. Chelouche is married to Bosmat, an attorney who was legal counsel for Bezeq and Tadiran. They live in Ramat Hasharon.

== Business career ==
Chelouche began working for Scitex Corporation, a world leader in digital imaging and printing systems, in 1979, as VP of Marketing and Business Development. In 1995, he replaced Avi Rosenfeld as CEO, Working in this position until 2001. During his tenure, the company had 4,000 employees and annual sales of over $700 million. Chelouche devoted himself to establishing ties with the Asian market and helped to increase his company's market share worldwide. In 2000, Scitex sold its digital pre-press operations to Creo of Canada in a share deal worth $500 million.

After leaving Scitex, Chelouche became president of Fantine Capital, a company that helped Israeli companies break into the European markets. In 2012-2015, he was co-chairman of Israel Advanced Technology Industries (IATI). He is on the board of directors of the Tel Aviv Stock Exchange (TASE), Tower Semiconductor (Towerjazz) and Check Point Software Technologies.

Chelouche has been managing partner of Venture Capital firm Aviv Venture Capital (formerly Fantine Europe Funds) since its inception in 2001, leading it with his cofounder Amir Guttman. Their first portfolio company, Actona Technologies, was sold to Cisco Systems for $100 million. Aviv's portfolio companies include MGVA, ScaleMP and Optimal Test. Another portfolio company, Briefcam, sold its surveillance technology to Canon Inc. in May 2018 for $90 million. Aviv has also invested in Orcam, a Jerusalem start-up developed by the founders of Mobileye, that allows visually impaired people to understand text and identify objects through audio feedback, using computer vision and a miniature camera attached to any eyeglasses. In 2018, it was estimated that the company is worth more than $1 Billion Dollars.

== Public activism ==
Chelouche is chairman of Ta'asiyeda, an educational initiative of the Manufacturers Association of Israel that exposes young people to the world of industry and technology.

== Awards and recognition ==
Chelouche won the Henry Ford Prize for first in class at INSEAD. In January 2010 he was named by INSEAD as "one of 50 alumni who changed the world."

== See also ==
- Economy of Israel
- Start-up Nation
