= Khatlyany rural council =

Khatlyany rural council is a lower-level subdivision (selsoviet) of Uzda district, Minsk region, Belarus. Its administrative center is Khatlyany.
