= Vozyera rural council =

Subdivision of Uzda district, Belarus

Vozyera rural council is a lower-level subdivision (selsoviet) of Uzda district, Minsk region, Belarus. Its administrative center is Vozyera
