= Dzyeshchanka rural council =

Subdivision of Uzda district, Minsk region, Belarus

Dzyeshchanka rural council is a lower-level subdivision (selsoviet) of Uzda district, Minsk region, Belarus. Its administrative center is Dzyeshchanka.
