= Nyoman rural council =

Nyoman rural council is a lower-level subdivision (selsoviet) of Uzda district, Minsk region, Belarus. Its administrative center is Mahilna.
