= Slabada rural council =

Slabada rural council is a lower-level subdivision (selsoviet) of Uzda district, Minsk region, Belarus. Its administrative center is Slabada.
