= Samy D. =

Israeli ceramic artist

Samy D. is an Israeli ceramic artist based in Tel Aviv.

== Art career ==
The Samy D. studio is located in Tel Aviv's Neve Zedek neighborhood.

His works have appeared in design and fashion journals. As of 2008 breakfast in El Al Airlines first-class cabin was served on Samy D. dishes. Samy D. has produced ceramics for commercial use and one-off artworks thrown on a potter's wheel, sometimes decorated with 14 carat gold.

One series of pieces are etched with micrographic passages from the Book of Genesis, some in Hebrew, some from the Vulgate. The text begins in even swirls but becomes "twisted and warped," at the verse where man is created.

== Awards and recognition ==
In 2009, Samy D. won first prize at the Alix De Rothschild Crafts Awards, an annual art prize given by the Alix de Rothschild Foundation in memory of Baroness Lavinia Anne Alix De Rothschild by a London-based jury to an Israeli artist for exceptional work in glass, jewellery, ceramics, textiles, or metal.

== Exhibitions ==
- Genesis – Periscope Gallery, Tel-Aviv, Israel
- SAMY D. – VeredArt Gallery, East Hampton, New York and museums.
- The PMA Craft show – Philadelphia Museum of Art, Philadelphia, PA USA
- The 5th Biennale for Israeli Ceramic Art, Tel-Aviv, Israel, 2007
- SOFA Chicago, by courtesy of AIDA
- Imagination – Israeli Art Exhibition, Tel-Aviv, Israel
- 'Nisui Kelim #5' – Bikurei Haitim Center, Tel-Aviv, Israel
- Imagination – Israeli Art Exhibition, Tel-Aviv, Israel
- True Colors 2009 – 100 Identities – Shorashim Art Gallery, Tel-Aviv

== Collections ==
- Kamm Teapot Foundation
- Kaufman Collection – Palm Beach, FL USA
- Rudin Collection – New York, NY USA
- Ran Rahav Collection – Tel Aviv, Israel
