= Salomon Bernstein =

Israeli painter (1886–1968)

Salomon or Schlomo Bernstein (Hebrew: סלומון ברנשטיין; 1886 in Uzda, Belarus – 1968 in Holon, Israel) was a Russian and Israeli painter. He completed art studies in Vilnius, Odessa as well as at École nationale supérieure des Beaux-Arts, Paris. He immigrated to Ottoman Palestine in 1914 and studied at the Bezalel Academy of Arts and Design. He was one of the founders of the Hebrew Artists' Association in 1920.

== Sources ==
- Benezit Dictionary Of Artists, Bedeschini-Bulow, Christopher John Murray (Ed.), 2006 ISBN 2-7000-3070-2, ISBN 978-2-7000-3070-9
