= Israel Rokach =

Israeli politician

- ישראל רוקח
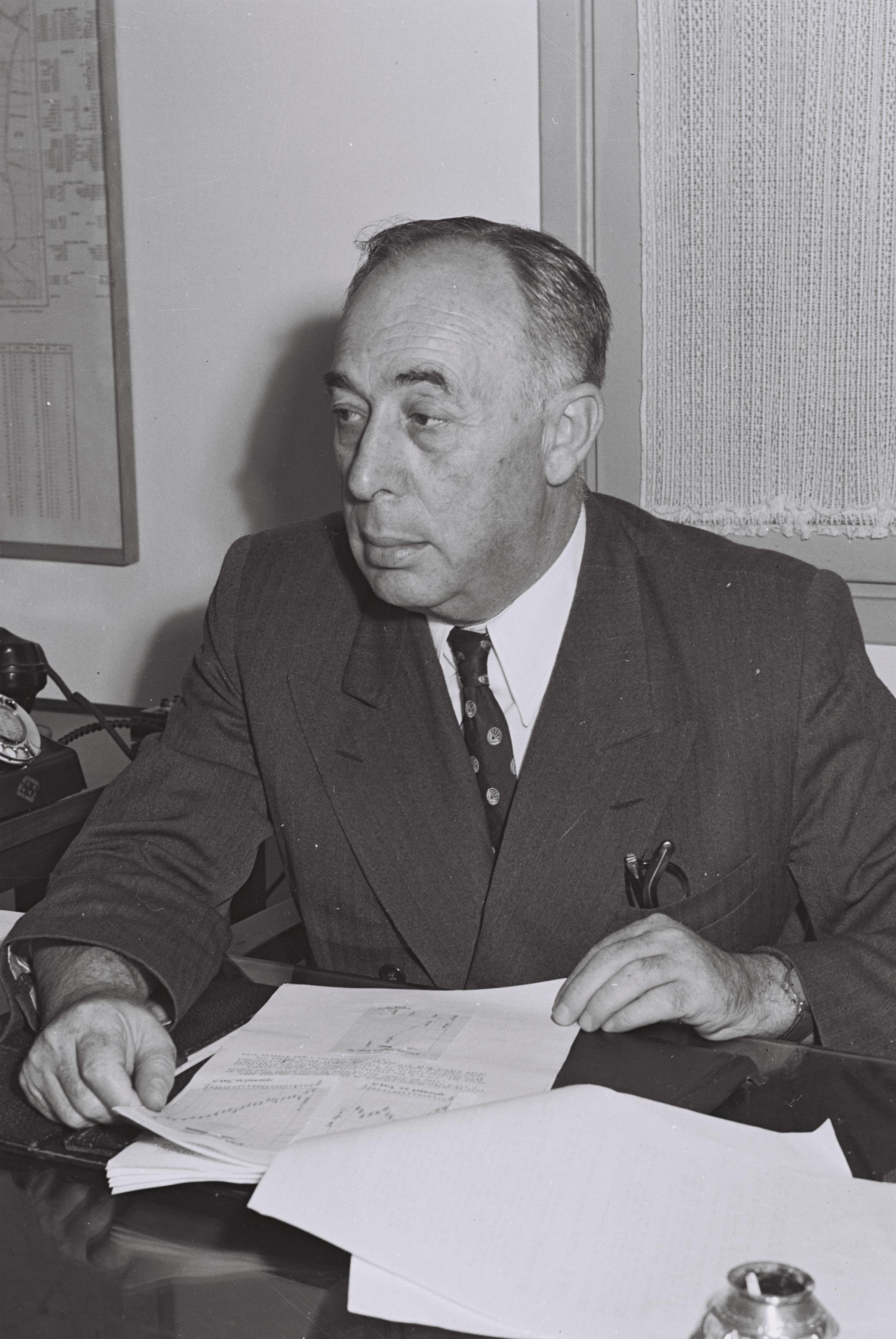

Ministerial roles
- 1952–1955: Minister of Internal Affairs

Faction represented in the Knesset
- 1949–1959: General Zionists

Other roles
- 1936–1953: Mayor of Tel Aviv

Personal details
- Born: 31 December 1896 Jaffa, Ottoman Empire
- Died: 13 September 1959 (aged 62) Israel

Israel Rokach, Honorary CBE (Hebrew: ישראל רוקח; December 31, 1896 – September 13, 1959) was an Israeli politician, Knesset member, and the fourth Mayor of Tel Aviv from 1936 to 1953.

== Biography ==
Israel Rokach was born in 1896 in Neve Tzedek, then part of Jaffa. His mother was Rachel Rokach (born in 1863). His father, Shimon Rokach (born in 1863), a journalist, was one of the founders of the neighborhood. His grandfather, Yisrael Bak, revived the Hebrew printing industry in Palestine. Rokach attended a cheder and then an Alliance Israélite Universelle school. He traveled to Switzerland, where he continued his education at a high school in Lausanne and then studied electrical engineering at the Zürich polytechnic.

In 1920, Israel Rokach moved to the United Kingdom, where he worked as an electrical engineer. In 1922, he returned to Jaffa, where he opened a store for electrical supplies. In 1933, Rokach married Esther Epstein.

Rokach died in 1959 and was buried in Trumpeldor Cemetery in Tel Aviv.

== Political career ==
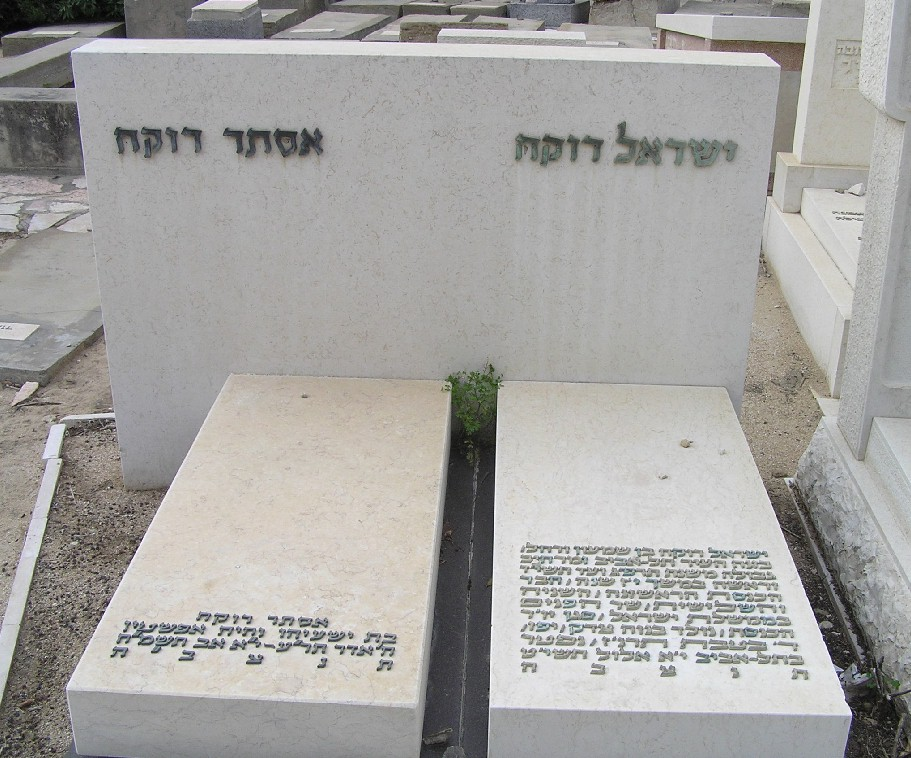
Graves of Israel and Esther Rokach

Rokach's first public position was council member in Jaffa, representing the Jewish neighborhoods of Neve Tzedek, Neve Shalom and Ohel Moshe. In 1922, he was elected to the city council of Tel Aviv, representing the United Centrist List party. In 1929 he was appointed deputy mayor to Meir Dizengoff.

Following Dizengoff's death in 1936, the city council held an emergency election for the office of Mayor. Rokach represented the right-wing parties, but lost to Moshe Chelouche of the workers' parties. Nevertheless, the British High Commissioner forced Rokach's appointment to the mayoral post. Despite public uproar about British intervention in the Jewish democratic process, Rokach went on to serve as mayor of Tel Aviv until 1953. For his great success, he was appointed an honorary Commander of the Order of the British Empire.

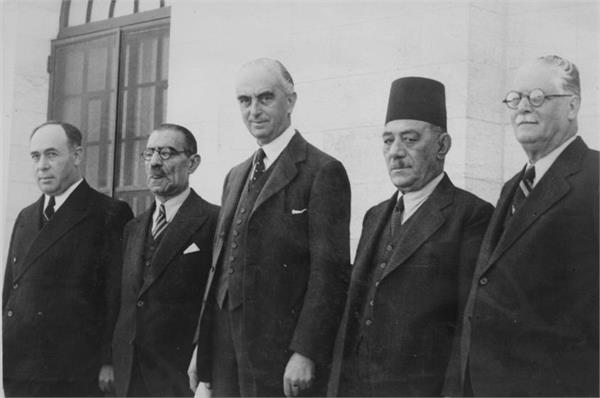
High Commissioner Harold MacMichael with Palestinian Mayors 1942: from left – Israel Rokach (Tel Aviv), Mustafa al-Khalidi (Jerusalem), MacMichael, Omar Effendi al Bitar (Jaffa), Shabtai Levy (Haifa)

During his tenure, Tel Aviv expanded rapidly and its population tripled. Jaffa, Rokach's birthplace, was merged into the city in 1949, giving it a significant population boost, despite Rokach's initial opposition to the merger.

The 1936–39 Arab revolt, World War II and the 1948 Arab-Israeli War all occurred during his tenure, including Operation Hametz – the capture of Jaffa from Arab hands. During this period, Tel Aviv was bombed from the air multiple times, the first being by the Italian Air Force in 1940. After this, underground shelters and loudspeaker systems were built, which also served the population in 1949, when Egyptian Spitfires made strafing runs on the city. In August of 1947, Rokach and other municipal leaders were imprisoned in Latrun for aiding Jewish underground organizations. He was released in September 1947.

In 1952, Israel Rokach delivered a farewell speech and ceased his municipal duties in Tel Aviv. However, he officially continued as mayor until Chaim Levanon was elected to replace him on April 13, 1953. Rokach served as head of the Maccabi World Union. He was a member of the Knesset from its first inception until the third as a member of the General Zionists. In the first and second Knessets, he was also a member of the Finance Committee. In the third Knesset, he also held the position of deputy speaker.

In the fourth and fifth governments, between 1952 and 1955, Israel Rokach served as the Interior Minister of Israel. In 2008, Israel honored him on a postage stamp.

== Awards and recognition ==
- Honorary OBE (1938)
- Honorary CBE (1945)

The Rokach Prize, an Israeli architecture award, is named after him.

A school in Yad eliyahu is named after him.
