= Moshe Chelouche =

Jewish politician and businessman (1892–1968)

- משה שלוש
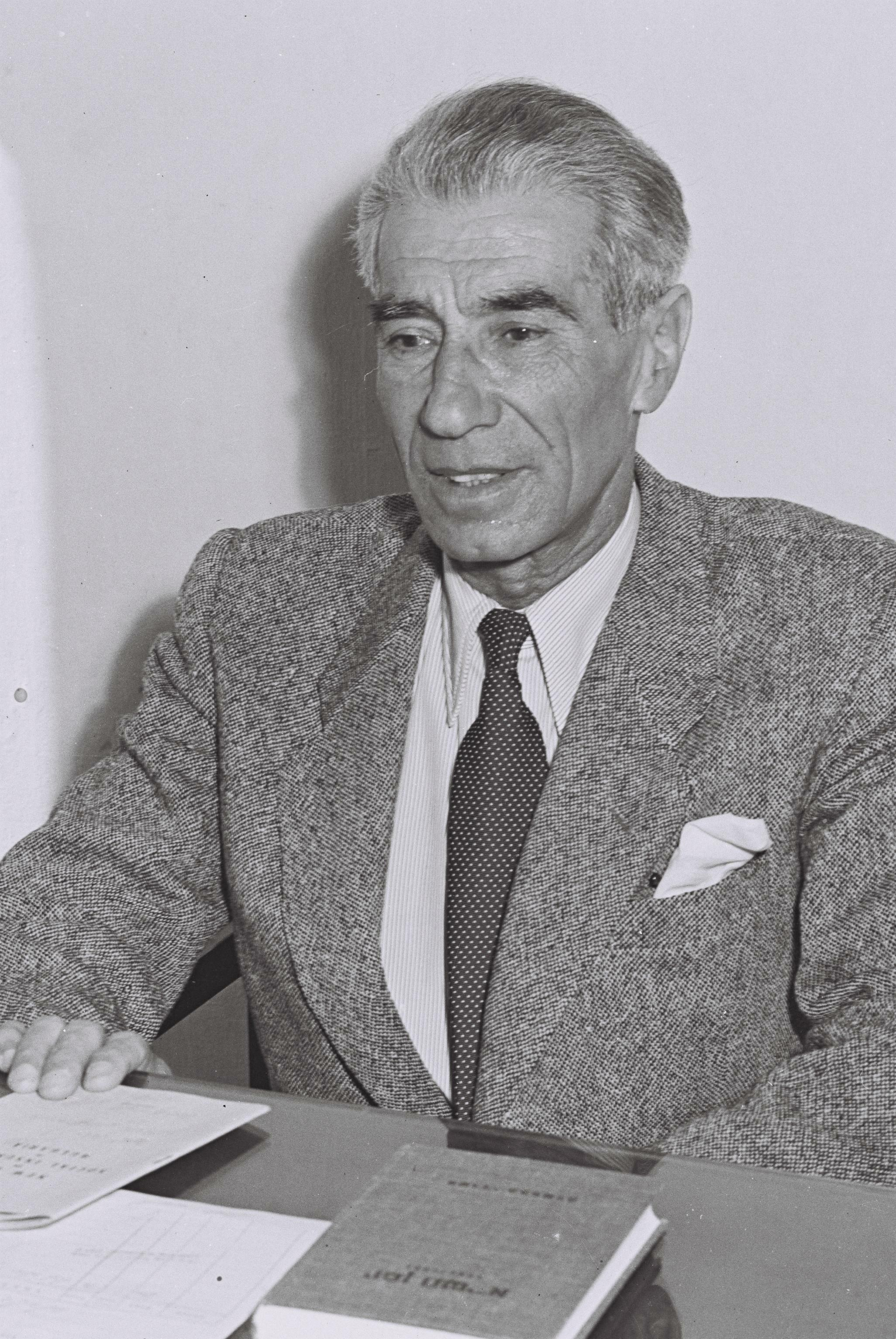
- Chelouche in 1950

3rd Mayor of Tel Aviv
- In office 20 October 1936 – 30 October 1936
- Preceded by: Meir Dizengoff
- Succeeded by: Israel Rokach

Personal details
- Born: April 7, 1892 Jaffa, Palestine
- Died: February 26, 1968 (aged 75)

Moshe "Musa" Chelouche (Hebrew: משה שלוש, Moshe Shlush; April 7, 1892 – February 26, 1968) was a Jewish politician and businessman in Mandatory Palestine and Israel who served in 1936 for 10 days as the mayor of Tel Aviv.

== Biography ==
Chelouche was born in Jaffa in the Ottoman Empire, and was educated in Ottoman Palestine, Marseille, and Beirut. His father was Yosef Eliyahu Chelouche, a businessman and founder of Tel Aviv. his father's father was Aharon Chelouche, and this mother's father had been the representative of Hovevei Zion. Both his parents were of Moroccan descent. During World War I, Chelouche helped Jewish Immigrants to Palestine receive Ottoman Citizenship, and helped Zionist Activists escape the area to avoid Ottoman Persecution. He was captured by the Ottomans in 1915 and imprisoned in Damascus for a year.

In 1928, Chelouche was elected to the Tel Aviv City Council. He was re-elected in 1935. Following the death of the city's Mayor, Meir Dizengoff on 23 September 1936, Chelouche returned from a visit in France to participate in the election of Dizengoff's successor. The City Council convened on 19 October and elected Chelouche mayor by a one-vote margin, defeating acting Mayor Israel Rokach. On 30 October, General Arthur Wauchope, the High Commissioner of Palestine, invalidated the election of Chelouche, without giving reasons, and appointed Rokach in his stead. The Council voted to condemn the decision on 15 November.

Chelouche served as Bulgaria's Honorary consul to Mandatory Palestine from 1930 to 1940, when he resigned after Bulgaria passed Anti-Jewish racial laws. Chelouche also helped found the Israel Philharmonic Orchestra

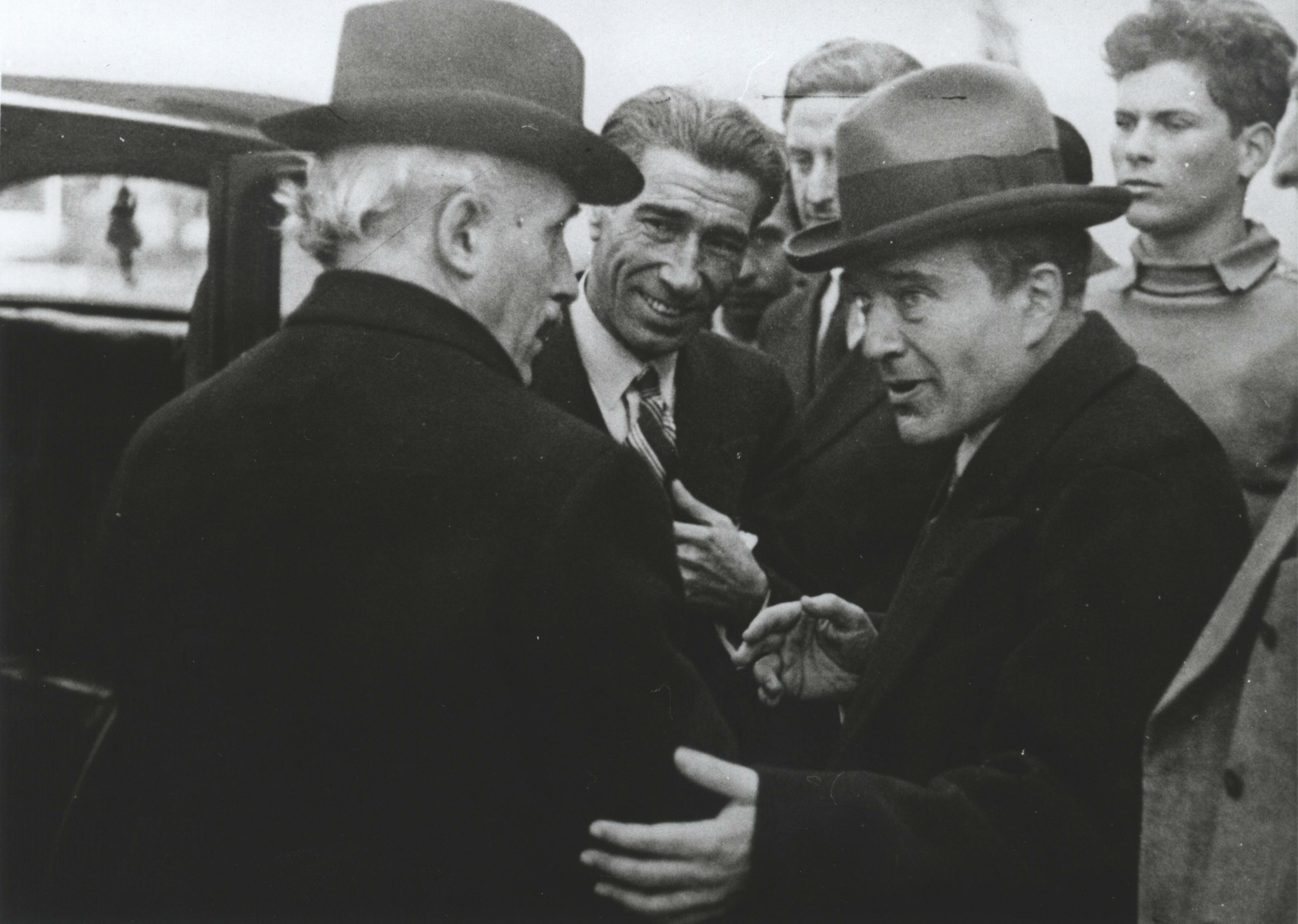
Chelouche with conductor Arturo Toscanini and violinist Bronisław Huberman, 1936

Chelouche was married to Rachel, the daughter of a rabbi. He had a son, Aharon, and a daughter, Leah.
