= Uzda =

Town in Minsk Region, Belarus

Uzda Узда
- Town
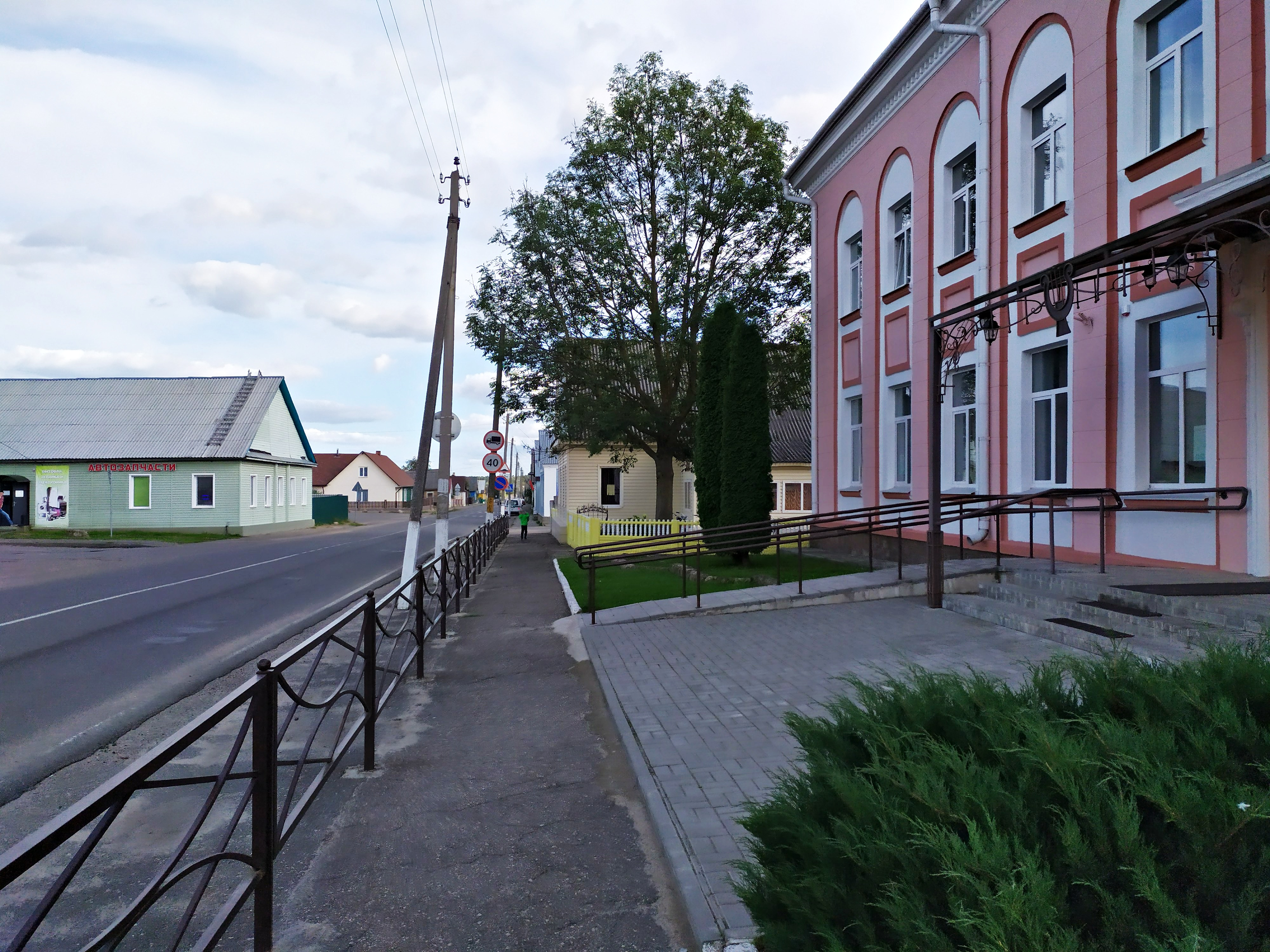

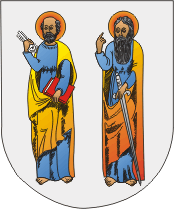
- Flag Coat of arms

- Location within Belarus
- Coordinates: 53°27′58″N 27°13′28″E
- Country: Belarus
- Region: Minsk Region
- District: Uzda District
- First mentioned: 1450
- Elevation: 172 m (564 ft)

Population (2026)
  - Total: 10,474
- Time zone: UTC+3 (MSK)
- Postal code: 223411
- License plate: 5
- Website: Official website

Uzda (Belarusian: Узда; Russian: Узда; Yiddish: אוזדע) is a town in Minsk Region, in central Belarus. It serves as the administrative center of Uzda District. In 2009, its population was 10,000. As of 2026, it has a population of 10,474. The town's name means "bridle".

== History ==
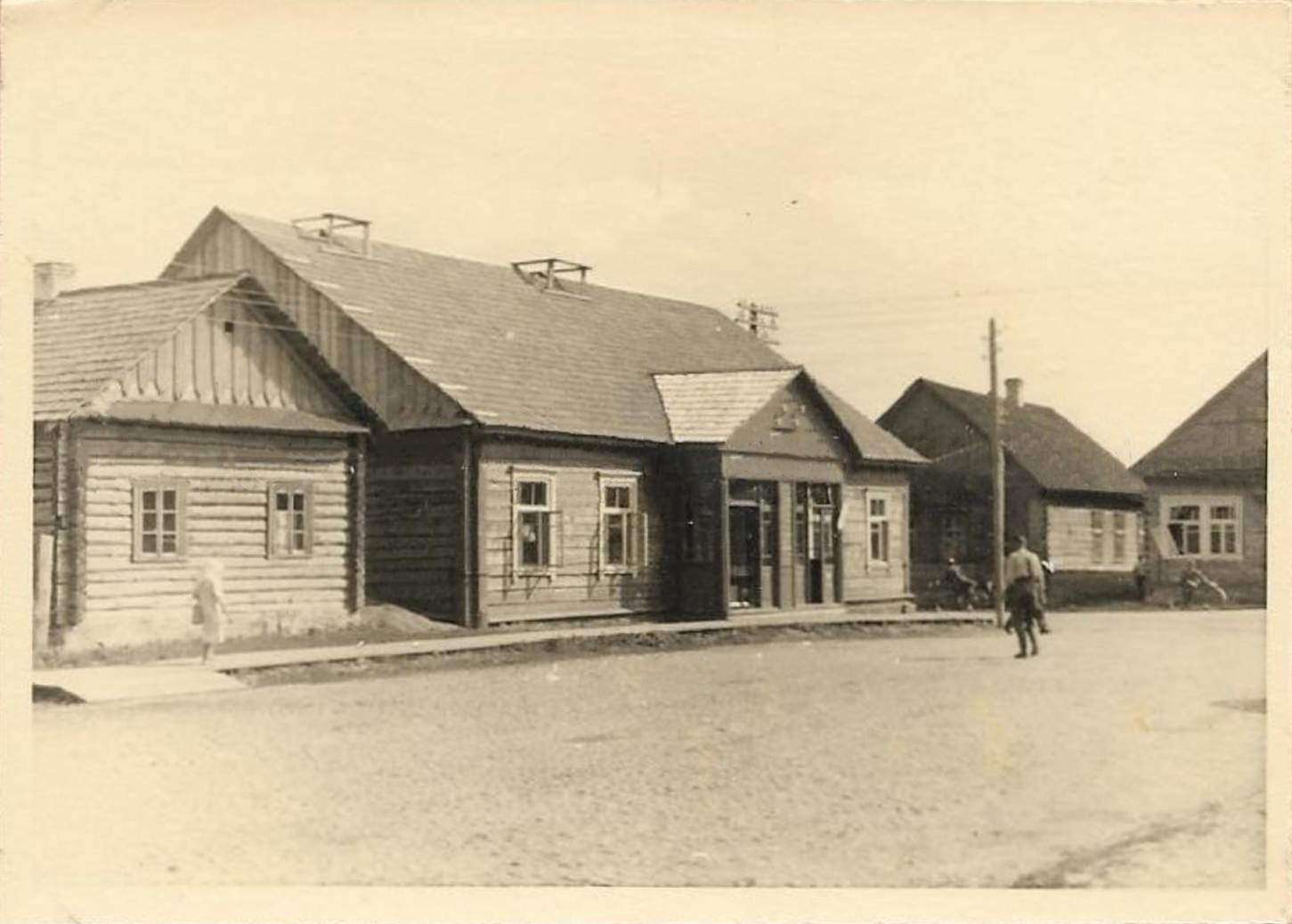
Uzda in 1941

Uzda was first mentioned in 1450 as a country estate belonging to the Korsaks. From the second half of the 16th century, it belonged to the Kaweczyński, Zawisza and Krasiński families. In 1574, Symon Budny spent time there working on a Bible publication.

Following the Second Partition of Poland, in 1793, it became a part of the Russian Empire. In 1798, the owner of the town, Kazimierz Zawisza, built a wooden Catholic church named the Exaltation of the Holy Cross. At the time there was also a functioning Orthodox church named Saint Peter and Paul. In 1839–1849, the town had a printer, a school, four primary schools, a brewery, a mill, a pharmacy, a post office, 30 shops and a Sunday Fair. In 1886, it had a public college, a local board of administration, a school, a distillery, a brewery, a cloth factory, two mills, 24 shops, Orthodox and Catholic churches, a synagogue, a mosque, and three prayer houses. From 1894 to 1939, the population increased from 2,800 to 3,500 people. The Jewish population in Uzda in 1900 was assessed as 2,068 people. The Jews were involved in trade and logging, while Tatars were often employed in tanning.

On 1 July 1924, it was made the center of the Uzda district of the Minsk region. On 28 June 1941, it was occupied by Nazi Germany. About 5,600 people, including 1,740 Jews in the ghetto, were murdered. On 29 June 1944, it was liberated by the 300th Voroshilov Partisan Brigade. On 25 December 1962, it was made a part of Dzerzhinsk district. On 30 July 1966, it became an independent district. Between 1970 and 1989, the population increased from 4,300 people to 9,500.

== Geography ==
Uzda is located 72 kilometres (45 mi) south-west of Minsk, 31 kilometres (19 mi) from the town of Stowbtsy, and 24 kilometres (15 mi) from the town of Dzyarzhynsk. Both of these towns are crossed by the M1 highway (part of European route E30).

== Demographics ==
=== Population ===
1897	1939	1970	1989	2006	2018	2023	2024	2025	2026
2,800	▲3,459	▲4,300	▲8,000	▲9,376	▲10,194	▲10,677	▼10,619	▼10,545	▼10,474

== Notable people ==
- Devorah Baron (1887–1956), pioneering Jewish writer
- Salomon Bernstein (1886–1968), painter
- Moshe Feinstein (1895–1986), American Orthodox rabbi, came from this town, before emigrating to the United States
