= Devorah Baron =

Israeli author of Modern Hebrew women's literature

- Native name: דבורה ברון
- Born: 4 December 1887 Uzda, Minsk Governorate, Russian Empire
- Died: 20 August 1956 (aged 68) Tel Aviv, Israel
- Language: Modern Hebrew
- Notable awards: Bialik Prize for Literature (1933); Rupin Prize (1944); Brenner Prize (1951)
- Spouse: Yosef Aharonovitz (died 1937)

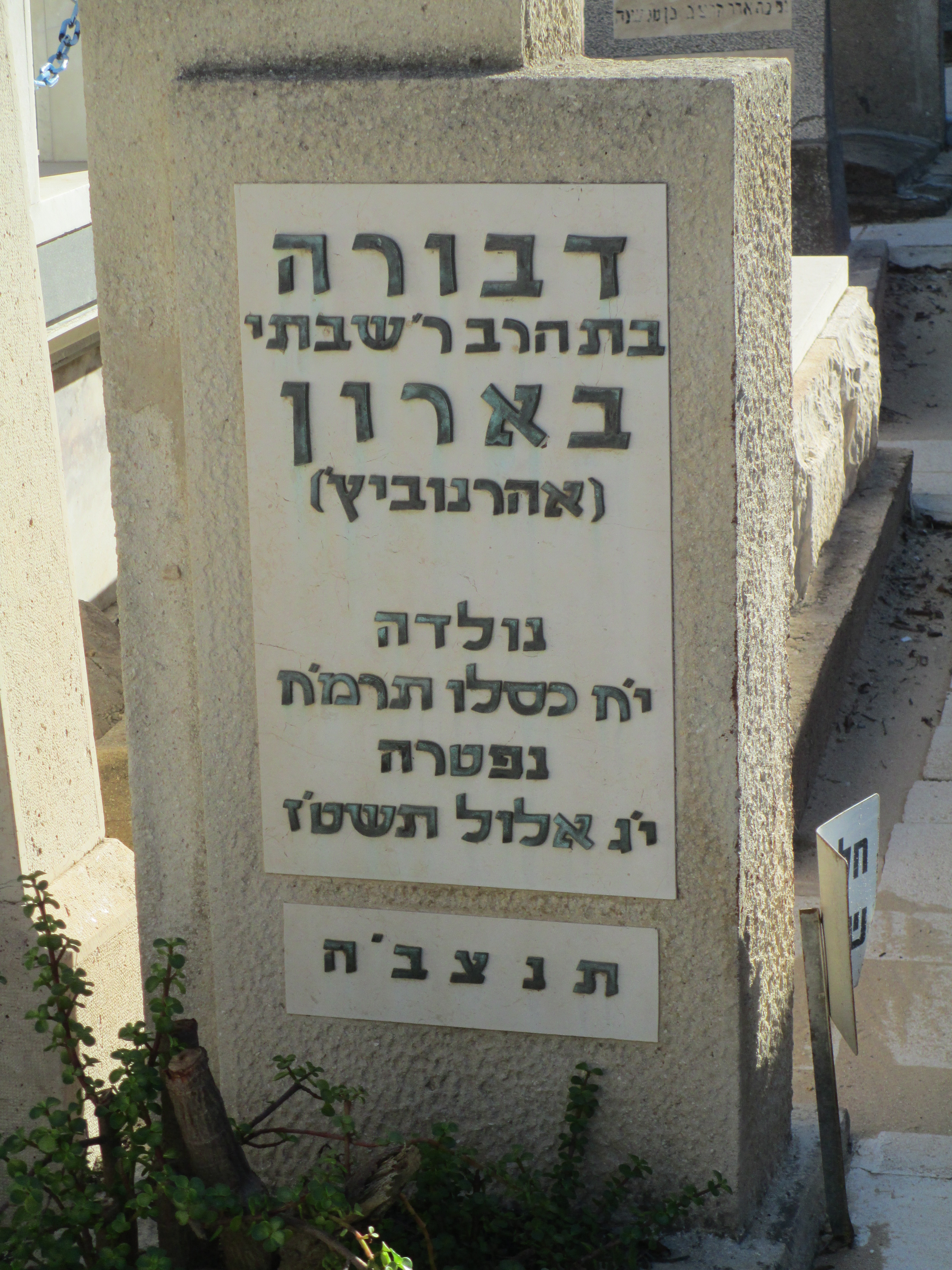
Baron's grave in Trumpeldor Cemetery, Tel Aviv

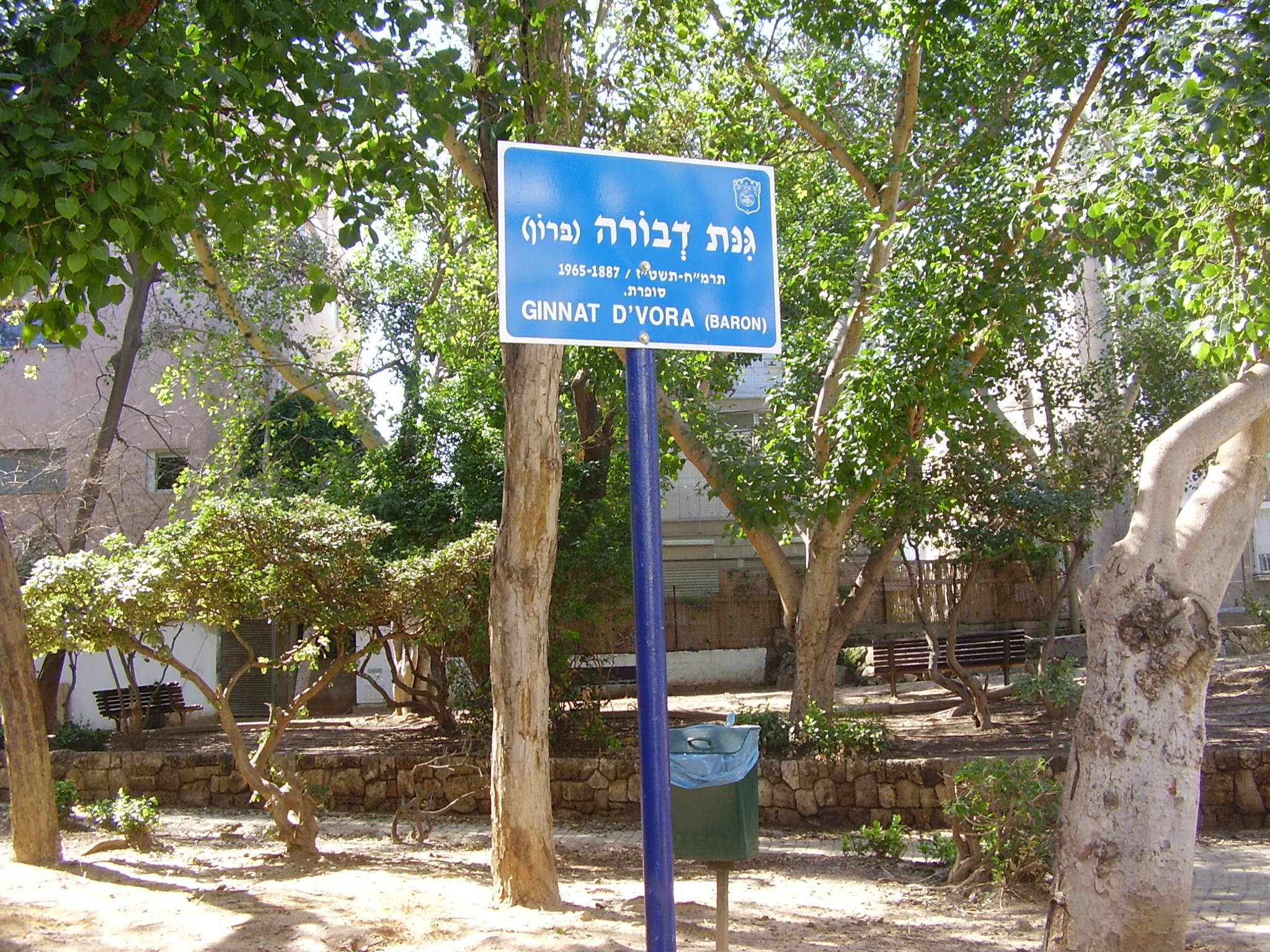
A garden named after Baron in Tel Aviv

Devorah Baron (also Dvora Baron) (Hebrew: דבורה ברון; 27 November 1887 – 20 August 1956) was a pioneering Jewish writer, noted for writing in Modern Hebrew and for making a career as a Hebrew author. She has been called the "first Modern Hebrew woman writer". She wrote about 80 short stories, plus a novella titled Exiles. Additionally, she translated stories into Modern Hebrew.

== Biography ==
Devorah Baron was born in Uzda, about 50 kilometers south-southwest of Minsk, which was then part of the Russian Empire. Her father, a rabbi, allowed her to attend the same Hebrew classes as boys, which was highly exceptional for the time, although she had to sit in the screened women’s area of the synagogue. Also, and again unusual for girls at the time, she completed high school and received a teaching credential in 1907. Baron published her first stories in 1902, at the age of 14, in the Hebrew-language newspaper Ha-Melits, which was edited at that time by Leon Rabinowitz. She appears in a photo of Yiddish writers in Vilna in 1909, when Mendele Moykher Sforim was visiting there, which is exceptional both because she is the only woman in the photo and because she does not appear in a similar photo of Vilna's Hebrew writers who posed with Mendele during his visit (the Hebrew writers having refused to have her—a woman—appear in their photo).

She was engaged to the author Moshe Ben-Eliezer, but he later broke it off.

In 1910, after her father’s death and later the destruction of her village in a pogrom, she immigrated to Palestine, settling in Neve Tzedek, a neighborhood the on outskirts of Jaffa that became part of Tel Aviv in 1909. In Palestine she became the literary editor of the Zionist-Socialist magazine Ha-Po’el ha-Za’ir (The Young Worker). She soon married the editor, the Zionist activist Yosef Aharonovitz (1877–1937). Along with other Jews in Palestine, they were deported to Egypt by the Ottoman government, but returned after the establishment of the British Mandate after the First World War. In 1922, Baron and her husband both resigned from the magazine. At this point, she went into seclusion, staying at her home until she died.

== Literary career ==
When the Bialik Prize for writing was first established in Israel in 1934, she was its first recipient. She later was awarded the Rupin Prize in 1944 and the Brenner Prize for literature in 1951.

Although she wrote and published throughout her life, she went through two phases, first as an active, socially daring young woman, and then as a recluse.

When she was ailing and dependent on others, she referred to some of her earlier stories as “rags”. The common thread throughout her life was her dedication to the art of writing. "Seclusion" is not an exaggeration: She chose "not to set foot out of her house" even for her husband's funeral, although one eyewitness reported, "I saw her descend three steps and return to her house." During this period she remained intellectually sharp and continued to write, composing "a group of stories depicting the world as seen through the window of an 'invalid's room' ("Be-Lev ha-Kerakh," in Parashiyyot)". Rachel Shazar notes that her stories, "animated by a deep empathy for the weak and the innocent," reflect profound learning: "No other woman writer in Israel was as familiar with the sources of Judaism as Devorah Baron."

During the latter part of her life she did some important literary translations into Hebrew, including Gustave Flaubert’s Madame Bovary. Though part of the Zionist movement, she wrote much about village life in the shtetls of Lithuania, "sometimes in near-poetic tones."

== Commemoration ==
In Israel, there is a street named after her in the City Rishon LeZion.

In Nehora, a community settlement, there is a writers’ residence called ‘Devora House,’ named after her.

== Published works ==
- Stories, Davar, 1927 (Sipurim)
- Hiding (story), Omanut, 1930 (Gniza)
- Small Things (stories), Omanut, 1933 (Ktanot)
- What Has Been (stories), Davar, 1939 (Ma She-Haya)
- For the Time Being (stories), Am Oved, 1943 (Le-Et Ata)
- From Over There (stories), Am Oved, 1946 (Mi-Sham)
- The Brickmaker (stories), Am Oved, 1947 (Ha-Laban)
- Sunbeams (stories), Am Oved, 1949 (Shavririm)
- Chapters (stories), Bialik Institute, 1951; ext. ed. 2000 (Parshiyot)
- Links (stories), Am Oved, 1953 (Chuliyot)
- From Yesterday (stories), Am Oved, 1955 (Me-Emesh)
- By the Way (stories), Sifriat Poalim, 1960 (Agav Orcha)
- Selected Stories, Yachdav/ The Hebrew Writers Association, 1969
- The Exiles (two novellas), Am Oved, 1970 (Ha-Golim)
- Three Stories, World Zionist Organization, 1975 (Shlosha Sipurim)
- Early Chapters (stories), Bialik Institute, 1988 (Parshiyot Mukdamot)
- Divorcing and Other Stories, Am Oved, 1997 (Kritot Ve-Sipurim Acherim)
- Shifra (stories), Babel, 2001 (Fradel; Shifra)
- Chapters (Parshiot), (Jerusalem 1951)
- The First Day and Other Stories. Translated by Naomi Seidman and Chana Kronfeld. Berkeley: 2001
- The Thorny Path and Other Stories, trans. Joseph Shachter (Jerusalem, 1969);

Also, translations into Hebrew, including Madame Bovary

== Works about Baron ==
- Aharonovitz, Zipporah. By the Way (in Hebrew). Merhavyah: 1961. (Biography by her daughter)
- Bernstein, Marc. 2001. "Midrashj and marginality: The ‘Agunot of S. Y. Agnon and Devorah Baron." Hebrew Studies 42: 7-58. doi:10.1353/hbr.2001.0017
- Baram, Einat Eshel. 2011. "Outline of a Gender Conflict: Notes on an Early Story by Dvora Baron." Women in Judaism 8.2. online
- Govrin, Nurit. Ha-Maḥatsit ha-ri’shonah [Early chapters]: Devorah Baron (in Hebrew). Jerusalem: Mosad Byaliḳ, 1988.
- Jelen, Sheila. Intimations of Difference: Dvora Baron in the Modern Hebrew Renaissance. Syracuse: Syracuse University Press, 2007.
- Jelen, Sheila and Shachar Pinsker, eds. Hebrew, Gender, and Modernity: Critical responses to Dvora Baron’s fiction (Studies and texts in Jewish history and culture, 14). Bethesda, MD: University Press of Maryland, 2007.
- Lieblich, Amia. Conversations with Dvora: An Experimental Biography of the First Modern Hebrew Woman Writer. Berkeley, CA: University of California Press, 1997.
- Lieblich, Amia. Embroideries: Conversations with Devorah Baron (in Hebrew). Jerusalem: Shoken, 1991.
- Pagis, Ada, ed. Devorah Baron: Mivḥar ma’amare bikoret ‘al yetsiratah (in Hebrew). Tel Aviv: ʻAm ʻoved, 1974.
- Pinsker, Shachar. "Unraveling the yarn: intertexuality, gender, and cultural critique in the stories of Dvora Baron." Nashim: A Journal of Jewish Women's Studies & Gender Issues (2006): 244-279.
- Rahman, Asmaa Abdel Karim Abdel. "Feminist trends in the products of Devorah Baron." LARK JOURNAL FOR PHILOSOPHY, LINGUISTICS AND SOCIAL SCIENCES' 2, no. 33 (2019).
- Seidman, Naomi. A Marriage Made in Heaven: The Sexual Politics of Hebrew and Yiddish. Berkeley, CA: University of California Press, 1997.
- Zierler, Wendy. 1999. "In What World? Devorah Baron’s Fiction of Exile." Prooftexts 19: 127–150.
