= Yosef Eliyahu Chelouche =

Founder of Tel Aviv, entrepreneur, and industrialist (1870–1934)

- יוסף אליהו שלוש
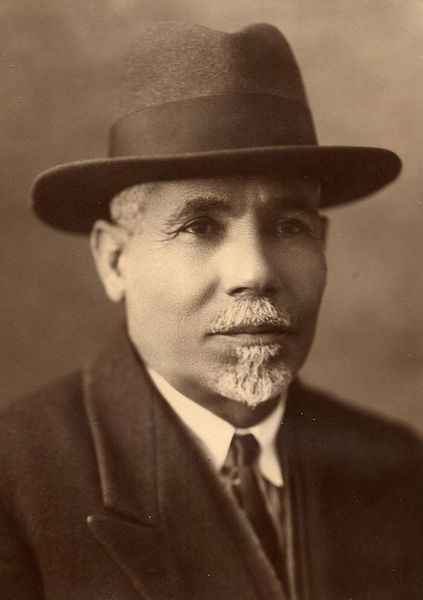
- Born: 1870; Jaffa, Ottoman Empire
- Died: 23 July 1934 (aged 63–64)
- Occupations: Entrepreneur, businessman, industrialist
- Known for: Co-founding Tel Aviv; contributions to construction and land development
- Spouse: Freha Simha Chelouche (née Moyal)
- Children: Moshe, Meyir, Avner, Tzadok, Hilel, Yehudit, Yoram
- Parent: Aharon Chelouche (father)
- Relatives: Avraham Haim Chelouche (brother)

Yosef Eliyahu Chelouche (Hebrew pronunciation: [ʃluʃ], Hebrew: יוסף אליהו שלוש; 1870 – 23 July 1934) was one of the founders of Tel Aviv, an entrepreneur, businessman, and industrialist.

== Early life ==
Yosef Eliyahu Chelouche was born in Jaffa, Ottoman Syria. His father, Aharon Chelouche, one of the prominent figures of the local Maghrebi Jewish community, was a goldsmith, money changer and land dealer. He was educated in a Jewish Talmud Torah and in the Tifereth Israel Jewish school in Beirut.

His marriage at the age of 17 had put an end to his formal education, and he turned to the field of trade. During the early 1890s he opened in Jaffa, together with his elder brother, Avraham Haim Chelouche, a store for building materials under the name of Chelouche Frères. The same name was used some years later also for a factory for cement-based prefabricated building products founded by the brothers, which operated until the end of the 1920s.

== Business and public activities ==
His business in the field of construction and the land trades of his father made Chelouche involved in the actual process of building. He started working also as a building contractor, a framework in which he got to build different kinds of buildings in northern Jaffa and later in Tel Aviv, the most significant of them were the Feingold Houses in Yefeh Nof (Bella Vista) neighborhood, the Girls School and the Alliance School in Neve Tzedek, 32 of the first dwellings of Ahuzat Bait neighborhood (later to be Tel Aviv) and the edifice of the Herzliya Hebrew Gymnasium. During the same time he also occupied himself – single-handedly or cooperating with others – in the business of land purchase in the environs of Tel Aviv and also in other parts of the country. Besides his private business, Chelouche dedicated much of his time for public matters. Above all was his concern for the development of the two cities he had spent his life in – Jaffa and Tel Aviv – and for its inhabitants welfare. Along with his wife, Freha Simha Chelouche (née Moyal), he was among the first founders of Tel Aviv. After World War I he was a member of the town's first local council. During the 1920s he was also a member of Jaffa's city council. In his public activities he initiated and conceived many ideas for the improvement and enhancement of the city, ideas which not once were carried out by others.

== Between Hebrew and Arab cultures ==
Chelouche was fluent in Arabic, and the language helped him in many times to play the role of a mediator between the Jewish and Arab inhabitants of Tel Aviv and Jaffa and to bring them together. Thanks to the friendly relationship he made with the leaders of the Arab populace he could find an attentive ear among them during times of peace as well as incidents and tension. As a member of Hamagen association, Chelouche had made many efforts, even before World War I, to convince, through essays published in Arab newspapers and meeting with Arab public figures, that there is no inherent conflict of interests between the Jewish settlement in Palestine and the Arab aspirations regarding the same territory. After the war, when the national conflict between Arabs and Jews became explicit and violent, Chelouche tried his best to offer both Jews and Arabs with a different perspective on their inevitable mutual life, although his views had become more and more unpopular.

== Later years and death ==
During the last years of his life, Chelouche was moving away from public affairs, although still active in several associations, among them The World Sephardic Association in Tel Aviv. During those years he wrote and published essays in Hebrew and Arabic newspapers, trying to express a different, non-partisan, voice regarding the questions of life in Palestine. Yosef Eliyahu and Freha Simha Chelouche had seven children – Moshe, Meyir, Avner, Tzadok, Hilel, Yehudit and Yoram.

Chelouche died on 23 July 1934, three months after the death of his wife. After Chelouche's death, the city of Tel Aviv named a street after him (Yosef Eliyahu Street), located near Fredric R. Mann Auditorium (Heichal Ha-Tarbut) in the heart of the city.
