= Eden Cinema =

Cinema in Tel Aviv, Israel (1913–1974)

Coordinates: 32.0617°N 34.7672°E

Eden Theatre
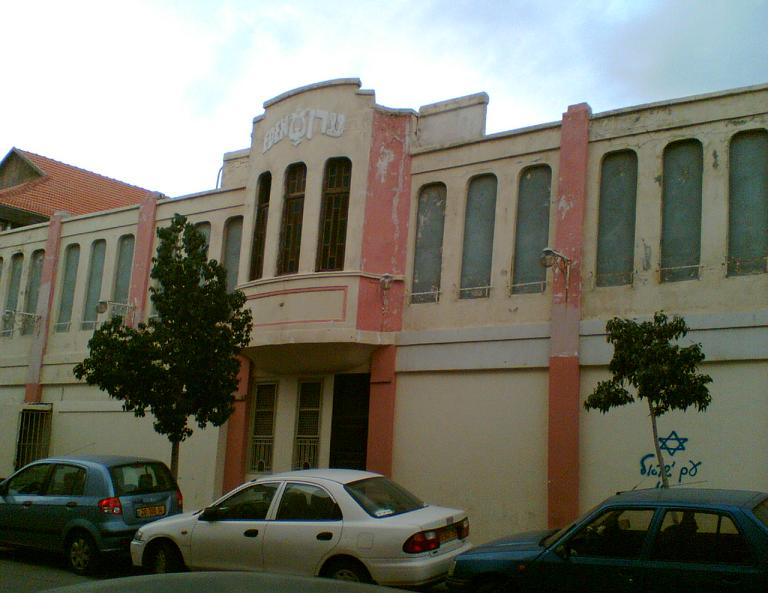
- Eden Cinema building in 2006
- Interactive map of Eden Theatre
- Address: Lilienblum Street 2 Tel Aviv; Israel

Construction
- Built: 1913
- Opened: 22 August 1914
- Architect: Richard Michael

Eden Cinema (formerly Eden Theater) was Tel Aviv's first movie theater, which started from a silent film theater and transitioned to a sound cinema in the late 1920s, as the technology developed. It was one of the key cultural institutions of early Tel Aviv.

The cinema building is located in Neve Tzedek, and features a distinctive design characteristic of the neighborhood.

== Founding ==
Moshe Abarbanel and Mordechai Weiser obtained a business license in 1913 to establish a movie theater on a sandy plot between Neve Tzedek and Ahuzat Bayit, despite opposition from neighbors. Eden Theater was inaugurated on 22 August 1914, designed by German architect Richard Michael, and constructed at the corner of Lilienblum and Pines Streets by Akiva Aryeh Weiss, a founder of Ahuzat Bayit. The name "Eden" was proposed by the writer S. Ben Zion.

The theater housed a French movie projector and a German electric generator, the first and only dynamo plant in the country at the time, which powered the surrounding streets before the establishment of Pinhas Rutenberg's Palestine Electric Corporation. The theater had 600 folding seats and 200 balcony seats, with multiple ticket classes. An orchestra played during silent films, and live opera supported Russian films.

Among the first films screened to a packed audience were Jone or the Last Days of Pompeii and "Spartacus", as well as silent Russian films. A local orchestra would parade through the streets, playing drums and cymbals to announce the premieres of new movies. The venue was given a thirteen-year monopoly on cinema in the city.

Hassan Bek, the governor of Jaffa, attended shows frequently and would take the profits and sometimes equipment. The Ottoman authorities confiscated the theater's movie projector during World War I, thinking it was a covert listening device transmitting to British ships, and deported the Jewish population of the city. The British arrived shortly after, allowed the Jews to return, and restored the theater to screen their own favorite films.

== Expansion ==
An open-air summer cinema called "Summer Eden", designed by architect Dov Hershkowitz, was added adjacent to the original cinema in 1927. The summer hall accommodated an additional 800 people. On hot summer evenings, the owner would spray rosewater to mask unpleasant odors, and fans were installed.

The theater featured major silent films from Hollywood and Germany's UFA Studios, accompanied by a resident chamber orchestra in the 1920s. Film translation pioneer Jerusalem Segal managed the intertitles using a magic lantern. It became a cultural hub, hosting the first performances of the Eretz-Israel Theater, the Israeli Opera under Mordechai Golinkin in July 1923, Purim balls, and beauty contests organized by the bohemian artist and dancer Baruch Agadati.

The silent film era at Eden ended in 1930 when Wiser and Abarbanel introduced sound film to Israel, with The Jazz Singer, which revolutionized cinema. This put the musicians out of business, but they negotiated a severance. The first Israeli film with sound screened was The Song of Israel, featuring cantor Yossele Rosenblatt, who died during its production. The venue hosted grand receptions for prominent figures, including General Allenby, Herbert Samuel, Lord Balfour, and Julian Amery. Facing financial difficulties in the 1940s, it was temporarily shut down during a labor dispute, which was resolved by giving 60% of the ownership stake to the employees, and the rest to the management.

== Later years ==
After Israel's establishment, the theater experienced a renaissance, screening films from Turkey, Persia, India, and Arab countries. Classics like Shree 420, Sangam, and movies starring Farid al-Atrash, Mohammed Abdel Wahab, Leila Mourad, and Raj Kapoor were immensely popular, attracting audiences from across the country.

Following persistent offers from Bank Leumi, the theater's management agreed to sell the theater after the Yom Kippur War, and it ceased operations in 1974 or 1975. The building was repurposed as the bank's data center in the 1980s, but was later abandoned. As part of White Night on June 28, 2012, the building hosted a video art exhibition. Plans were announced in 2016 to add additional floors to the cinema and convert it into a sixty-room luxury hotel. The structure remains sealed and neglected, although the original sign and ticket booth are still recognizable.

== Art ==
Eden Cinema has featured in several paintings, and the building itself has been a canvas for murals.

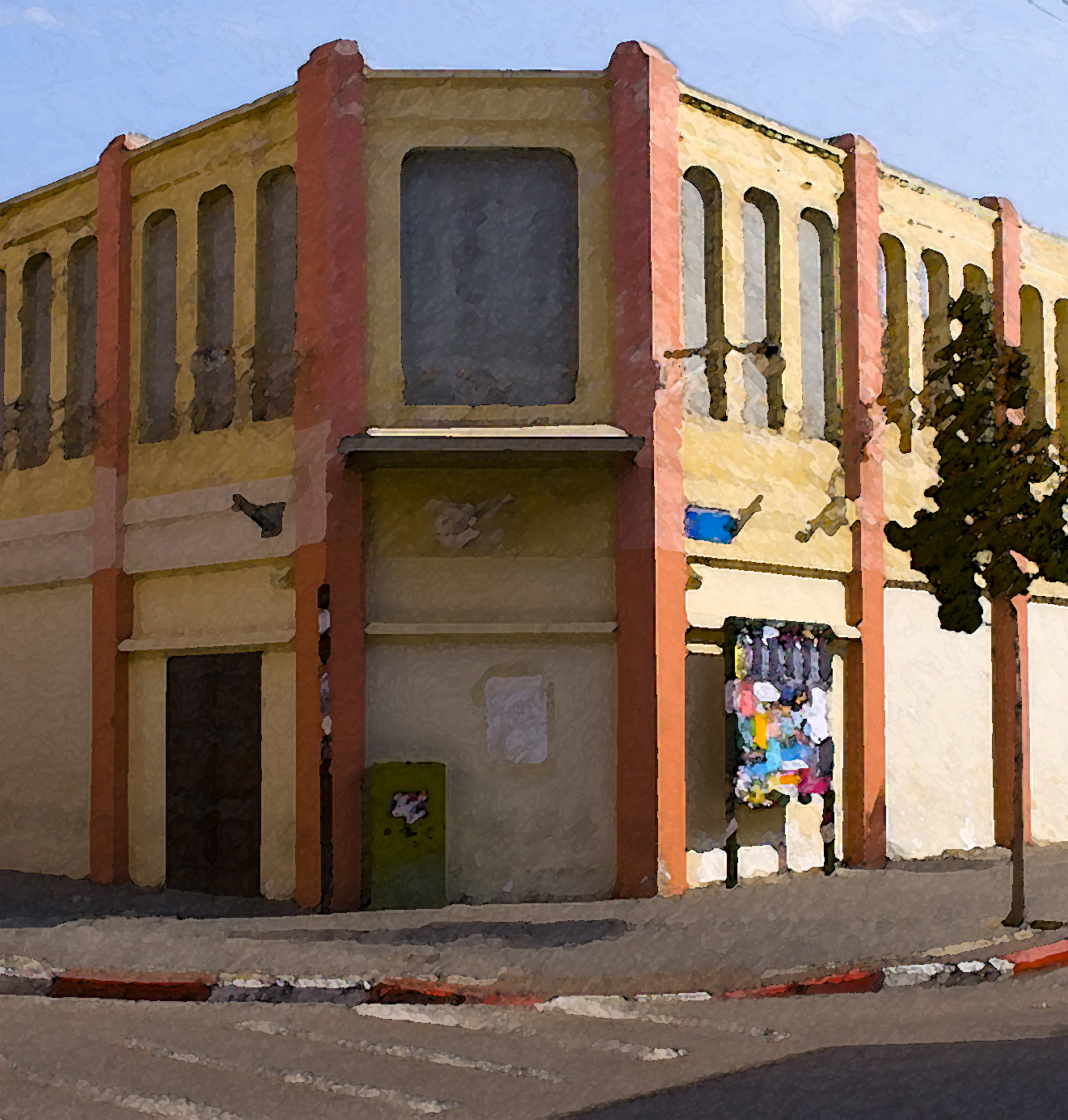

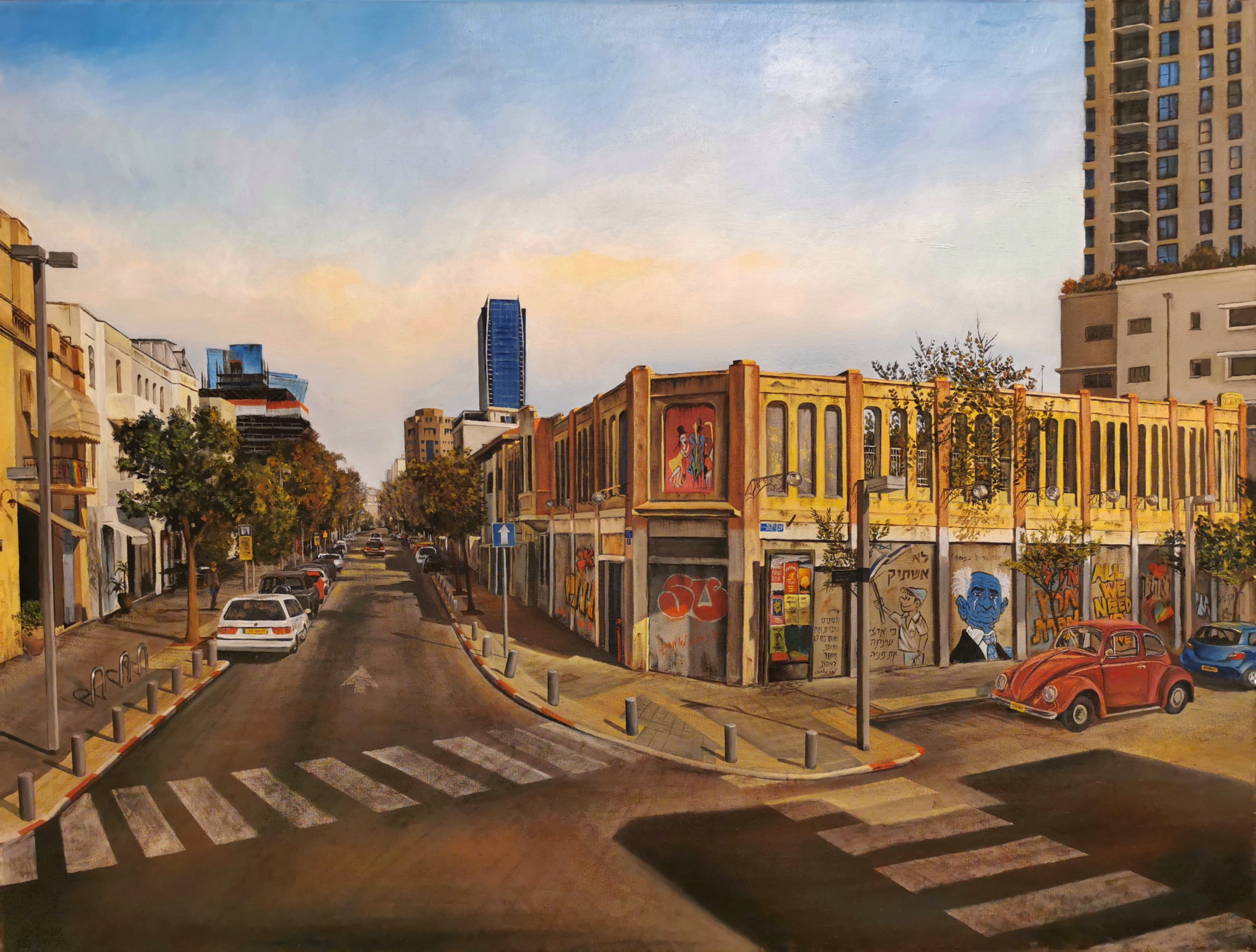
"Eden" by Yedidya Ish Shalom, who lives in the neighborhood.
