= Neve Tzedek =

Neighborhood in Tel Aviv

Neve Tzedek נווה צדק
- Neighborhood
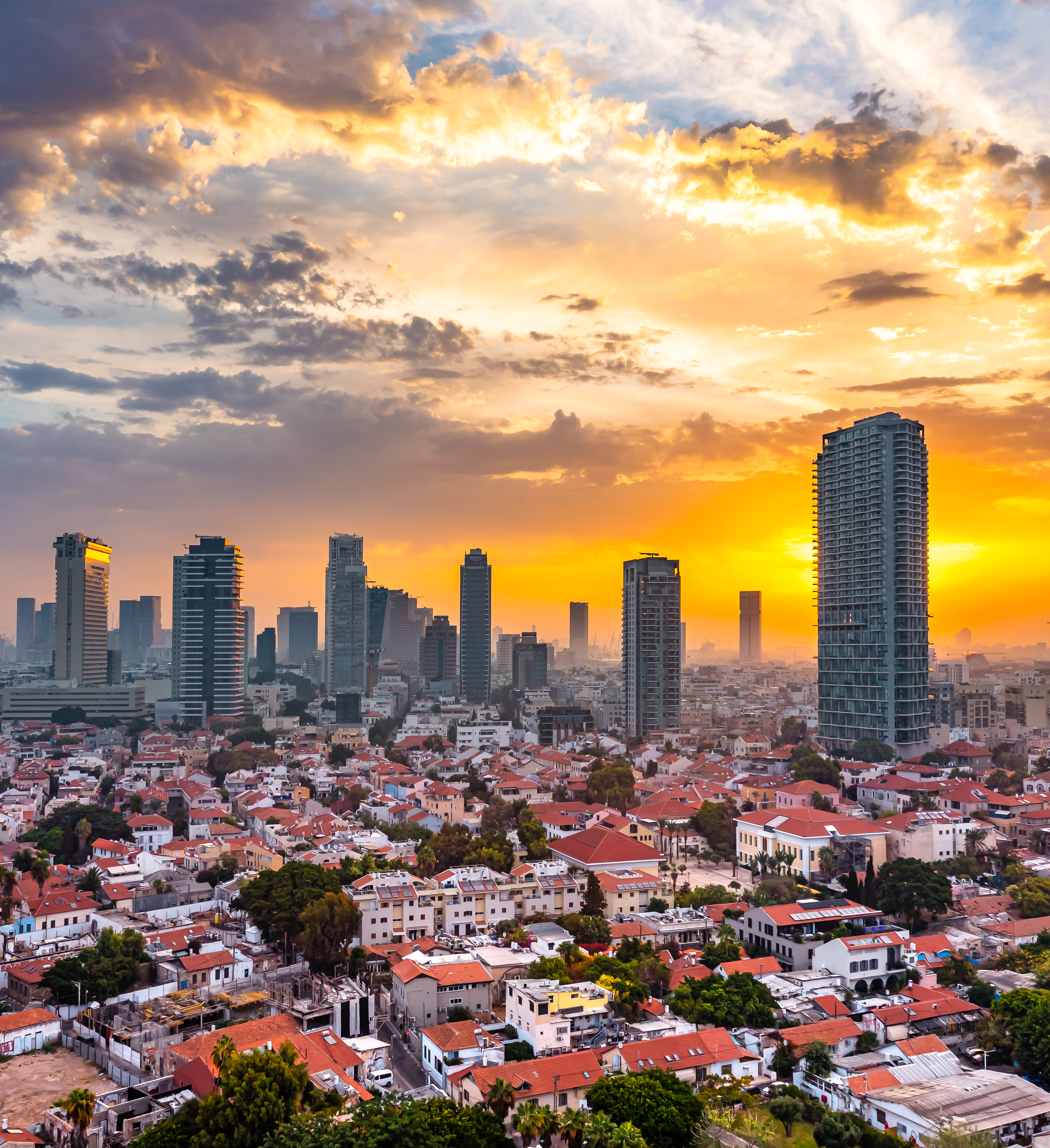
- Skyline in Neve Tzedek
- Interactive map of Neve Tzedek
- Coordinates: 32°03′41″N 34°45′53″E
- Country: Israel
- District: Tel Aviv District
- City: Tel Aviv
- Established: 1887

Population (2025)
  - Total: 4,698
- Time zone: UTC+2 (IST)
  - Summer (DST): UTC+3 (IDT)
- Postal code: 65153
- Area code: 03

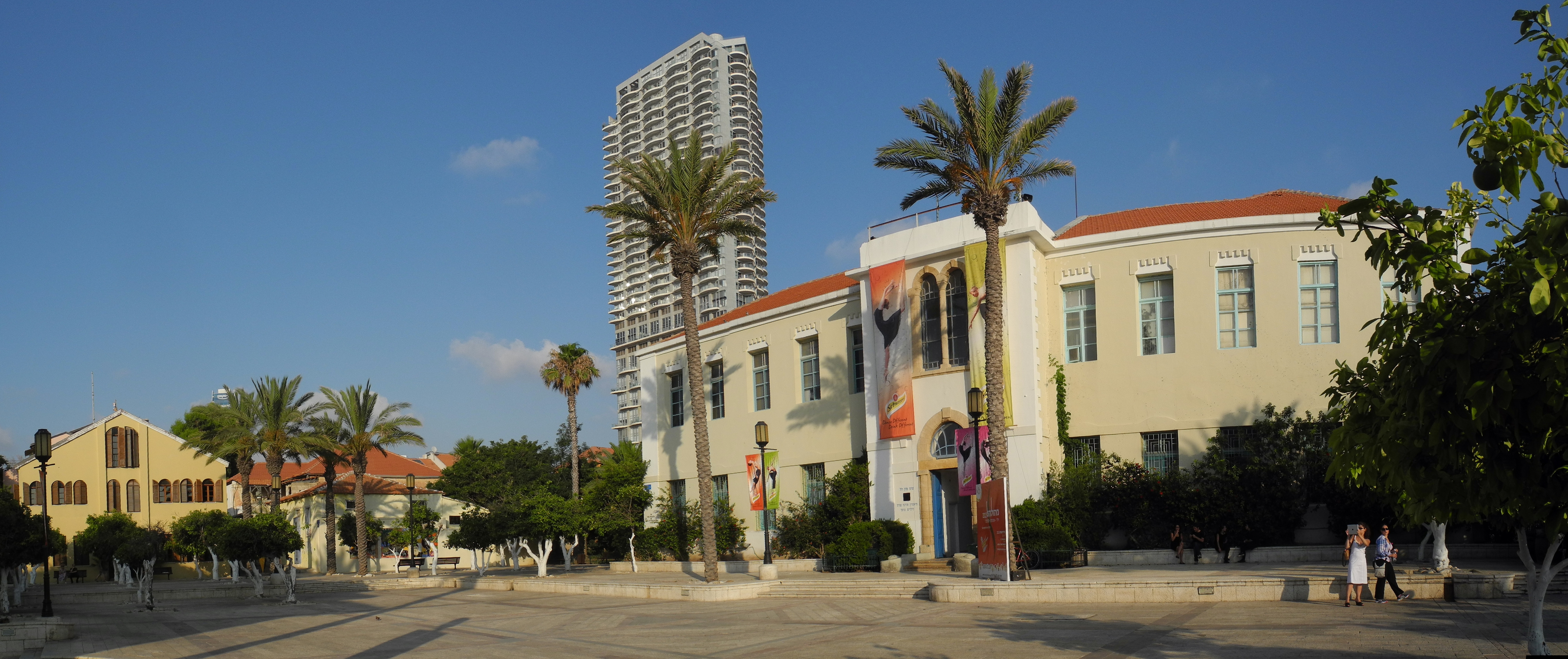
Suzanne Dellal Center for Dance and Theater, Neve Tzedek

Neve Tzedek (Hebrew: נווה צדק, romanized: Nevé Tsédeq, lit. 'Oasis of Justice') is a neighborhood in southwestern Tel Aviv, Israel. The neighbourhood borders Kerem HaTeimanim to the north, Florentin to the southeast, and Jaffa to the south and southwest. To the west, it adjoins Charles Clore Park and the Mediterranean coastline.

Neve Tzedek was named after a phrase from the biblical Book of Jeremiah in the Tanakh. In 1887, it was the first Jewish neighborhood established outside the walls of the ancient port of Jaffa, preceding the establishment of Tel Aviv by more than two decades. A group of 48 Jewish families led by Shimon Rokach, a Jerusalemite pioneer of agriculture, and Aharon Chelouche, a landowner and businessman from Jaffa settled in the area in 1883.

At the beginning of the 20th century, Neve Tzedek was the cultural center of the developing Tel Aviv, where many prominent representatives of the Jewish creative intelligentsia lived and worked, including the future Nobel laureate Shmuel Yosef Agnon and the artist Nachum Gutman, who described life in Neve Tzedek in their autobiographical works.

After the formation of the State of Israel in 1948, Neve Tzedek became one of the centers for the settlement of new immigrants. Having survived years of neglect in the 1970s, Neve Tzedek was slated for demolition, but public opposition led to a decision to restore the historic quarter; since the 1990s, it has become increasingly bohemian and fashionable. The area, which eventually became part of Tel Aviv and no longer has municipal self-government, is now one of the city's attractions, drawing tourists with its turn-of-the-century atmosphere, historic buildings, artisan workshops, shops, and cafes.

Neve Tzedek is part of the Tel Aviv-Yafo Municipality in the Tel Aviv District and is served by the city's municipal government. The area code for the neighborhood is 03.

== Name ==
Literally, Neve Tzedek means Oasis of Justice, but it is also one of the names for God (Jeremiah 50:7). The verse was taken from the Tanakh, from the Book of Jeremiah, where the Almighty is called "oasis of justice".

== History ==
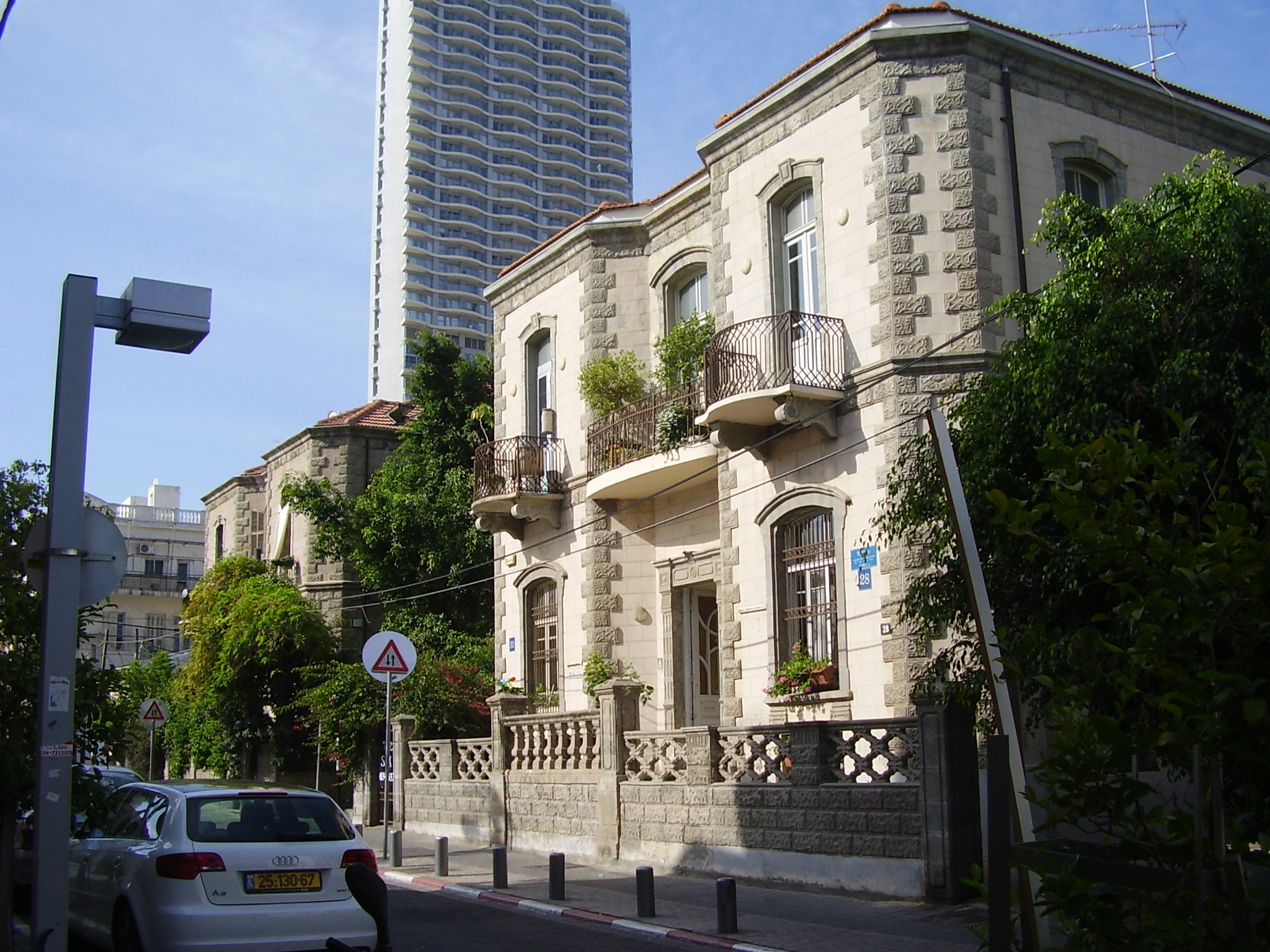
Restored house in Neve Tzedek

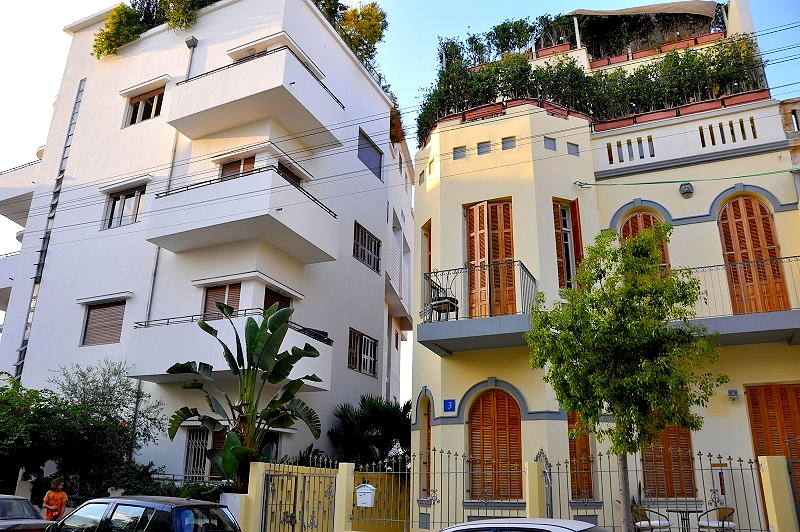
Bauhaus and eclectic architecture in Neve Tzedek

Neve Tzedek was established by a group of Sephardi Jewish families seeking to move outside of over-crowded Jaffa. Notably, the family of Aharon Chelouche moved to the area in 1883 with some 50 families following suit in the next few years. The neighbourhood was officially established in 1887. Additional neighborhoods grew up around Neve Tzedek, among them Neve Shalom (1890), Yefe Nof (1897) and Batei Feingold (1904).

The new quarter featured low-rise buildings along narrow streets. These homes frequently incorporated design elements from the Jugendstil/Art Nouveau and later Bauhaus art movements and some had contemporary luxuries such as private bathrooms.

At the beginning of the 1900s, the neighborhood attracted upcoming artists and writers, among them future Nobel Prize laureate Shmuel Yosef (Shai) Agnon and the Jewish artist Nachum Gutman.

The writers Yosef Haim Brenner, Devorah Baron and Yosef Aharonovitz lived in the "Writers House" at Rokach 21, which also served as the editorial office of Hapoel Hatzair.

Rabbi Abraham Isaac Kook was the first rabbi of Neve Tzedek and opened a Yeshiva there. During his time in Neve Tzedek he became close friends with many of the writers, especially Agnon.

As Tel Aviv began to develop, many affluent residents moved northward. The buildings fell into disrepair due to neglect and the corrosive effects of the coastal climate. By the 1960s, the neighborhood suffered from serious urban decay. However, plans to demolish the neighbourhood to make way for high rise apartments fell through as many buildings were declared heritage sites worthy of preservation. By the end of the 1980s, work began to renovate and preserve Neve Tzedek's century-old structures. New establishments were housed in old buildings, most notably the Suzanne Dellal Centre for Dance and Theatre and the Nachum Gutman Museum, located in the artist's home. This gentrification led to Neve Tzedek's rebirth as a fashionable and popular upmarket residence for Tel Avivians. Its main streets became lined once again with artists' studios, including the ceramics studio of Samy D., alongside trendy cafés and bars, and more recently boutique hotels and shops selling handmade goods.

== Education ==
In 1893, the Hebrew School for Girls was established in Jaffa, under the auspices of the "Kol Israel Haverim" and the "Hovevei Tzion" association, and from 1908 was housed in a building in Neve Tzedek, built by Joseph Eliyahu Chelouche, until the school's closure in 1972. The school was renamed Yechiely Girls School, after the former principal, Yehiel Yechiely, who served the school between 1918 to 1937. Prior to the First World War, 450 pupils were enrolled at the school. In 1908, the Alliance School for boys was also built. This was followed in 1913 by the Seminar Lewinsky, a teaching seminary that operated at that location until 1939.

The Marc-Chagall Collège français Marc-Chagall de Tel-Aviv (Hebrew: בית הספר הצרפתי מארק שאגאל תל אביב), a French international school, is in Neve Tzedek.

== Development plans ==
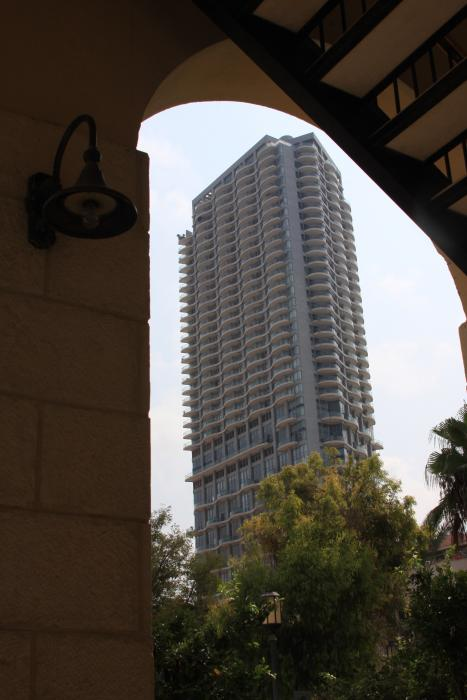
Neve Tzedek Tower

In 2009, the Tel Aviv municipality began to approve plans to construct a number of new highways and widened arterial roads throughout southern Tel Aviv, including the proposed railway road, which would partially encircle Neve Tzedek. As part of these plans, the municipality approved the construction of a large number of skyscrapers in and around Neve Tzedek. A number of parking lots would also be constructed along Rothschild Boulevard in order to handle the parking demand induced by the new road space.

Opponents of this plan argued that the addition of new skyscraper-lined highways would dramatically alter the historical and social character of Neve Tzedek and its surrounding areas in southern Tel Aviv. Furthermore, residents and environmentalists were concerned about the effects of large amounts of traffic being funneled through the area. Opponents believe that the discussions have been conducted outside of the public view and with developers' interests being put before those of the community.

== In popular culture ==
Shmuel Yosef Agnon, a Nobel Prize laureate in literature, describes Neve Tzedek at the beginning of the 20th century in his autobiographical novel, Only Yesterday, translated from Tmol Shilshom (Hebrew: תמול-שלשום).

Another book set in Neve Tzedek is Between the Sands and the Blue Sky (Hebrew: בין חולות וכחול שמיים), the autobiography of the artist, Nahum Gutman.

The Academy Award-nominated film, The House on Chelouche Street (1973) by Moshé Mizrahi is set on Chelouche Street in Neve Tzedek.

== Notable residents ==
- Roman Abramovich (born 1966), former Chelsea FC owner, businessman, investor, and politician
- Shmuel Yosef Agnon (1888–1970), modern Hebrew writer, Nobel Prize laureate for literature
- Baruch Agadati (1895–1976), classical ballet dancer, choreographer, painter, and film producer and director
- Devorah Baron (1887-1956), modern Hebrew writer
- Ángel Bonanni (born 1977), actor and model
- Yosef Haim Brenner (1881–1921), pioneer of modern Hebrew literature
- Aharon Chelouche (born 1827), Algerian Jewish businessman, co-founder of the neighborhood
- Yosef Eliyahu Chelouche (1870–1934), son of Aharon, one of the founders of Tel Aviv, entrepreneur, businessman and industrialist
- Gal Gadot (born 1985), actress and model
- Miriam Glazer-Ta'asa (born 1929), politician
- Nachum Gutman (1898–1980), painter, sculptor, and children's books author
- Yoram Kaniuk (1930–2013), writer, painter, journalist, and theater critic
- Sara Levi-Tanai (1910–2005), choreographer and songwriter
- Israel Rokach (1886–1959), politician, second mayor of Tel Aviv (1936–1953), son of Shimon Rokach, one of the founders of the neighborhood

== See also ==
- Neighborhoods of Tel Aviv
- History of Tel Aviv
- Eden Cinema
- Aaron Chelouche
