= Aharon Chelouche =

Algerian Jew, among Tel Aviv founders (died 1920)

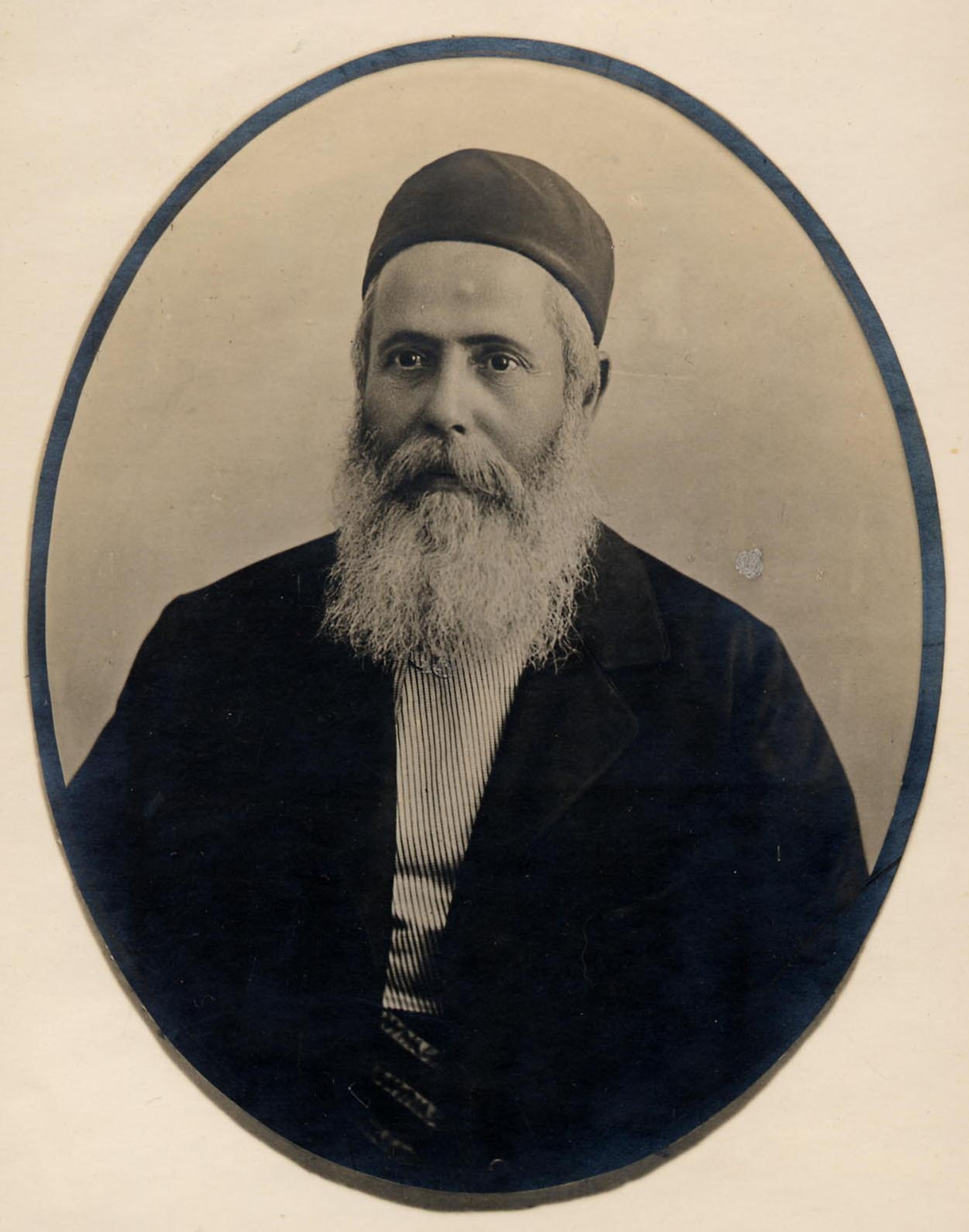
- Chelouche in the late 19th century
- Born: Oran, French Algeria
- Died: April 7, 1920; Occupied Enemy Territory Administration

Aharon Chelouche (Hebrew: אהרן שלוש / Algerian Arabic: هارون ثلاثة, romanized: Hārūn Tlata, Died April 7, 1920) was an Algerian Sephardic Jew, landowner, jeweler and moneychanger. At the end of the 19th century, he was a major figure in Jaffa's Jewish community. He was also known as the founder of the Neve Tzedek neighbourhood, now part of Tel Aviv, Israel.

== Early life ==
Chelouche was born in the Algeria City of Oran. His family moved to Ottoman Palestine in 1840, when his parents travelled by ferry to Haifa. Soon afterwards the family moved to Nablus, then to Jerusalem, and thereafter finally to Jaffa. They became soon one of the leading families in the city, having exceptional good leadership skills. The Chelouche family had good connections with Arab families, as they spoke Arabic. One of the known family friends was a Turkish governor. Aharon had two sons, Avraham Haim and Yosef Eliyahu, as well as five daughters.

== Adult life and career ==
Aharon worked in the gold and silver trade and as a money changer, and purchased land outside Jaffa. He bought land north-east of Jaffa, where he built a house and then facilitated the creation of the neighbourhood of Neve Tzedek. Chelouche's house was one of the largest residential buildings in the late 19th century. The family started to grow and Aharon built a second floor for the house. At the east part of the house is a synagogue. Today the house is an important landmark in Neve Tzedek, but it is in a poor state of preservation and is again under construction.

The Chelouche family has also been involved in the iron and tile industry.

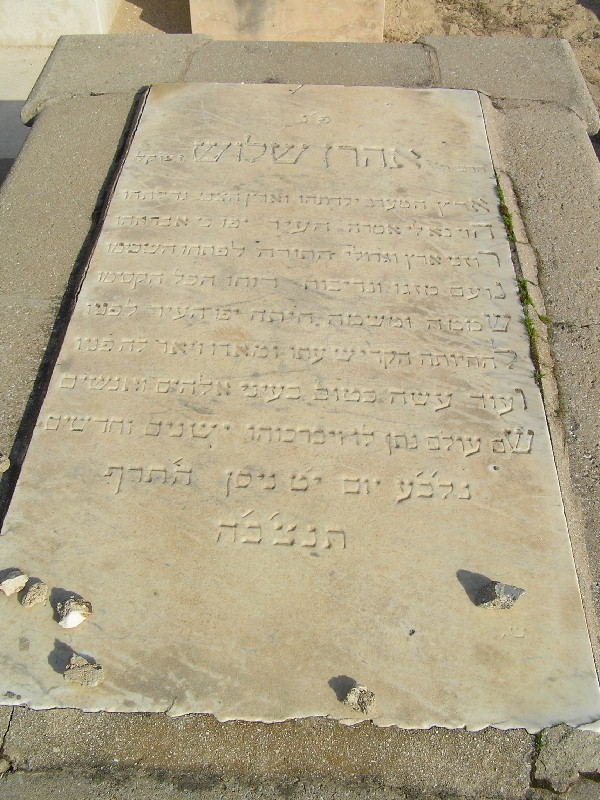
Tomb of Aharon Chelouche in Trumpeldor Cemetery, Tel Aviv

Aharon was interested in religious education, and hired a rabbi from Beirut to teach Torah in Jaffa. He died in 1920 at the age of 91, and is buried in the Trumpeldor Cemetery in Tel Aviv.

His younger son, Yosef Eliyahu, became one of the founders of Tel Aviv. Chelouche's grandson, Moshe, briefly served as mayor of Tel Aviv in 1936.

== See also ==
- Eden Cinema
- Neve Tzedek
- Suzanne Dellal

== Photo gallery ==
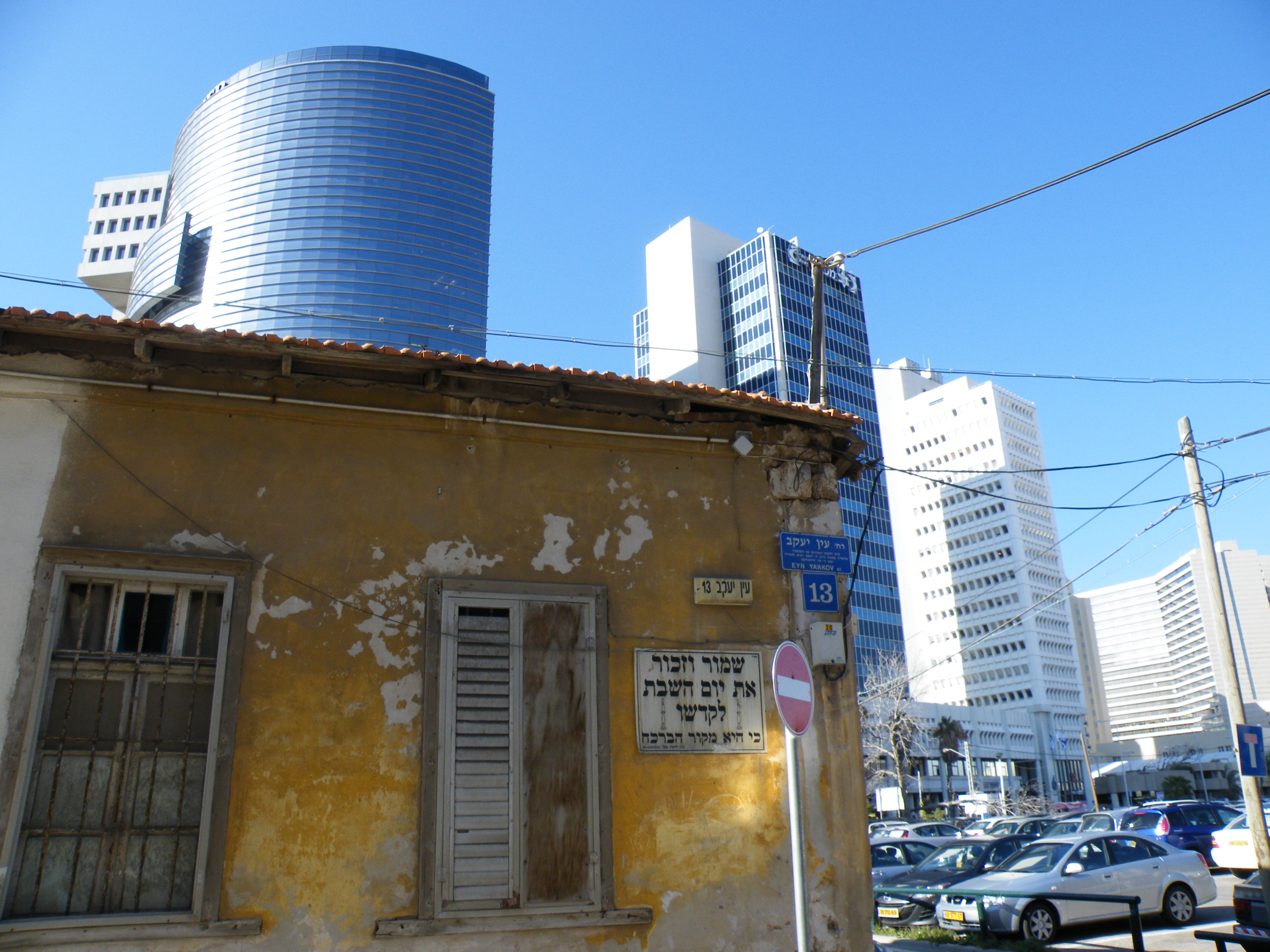
Neve Tzedek today

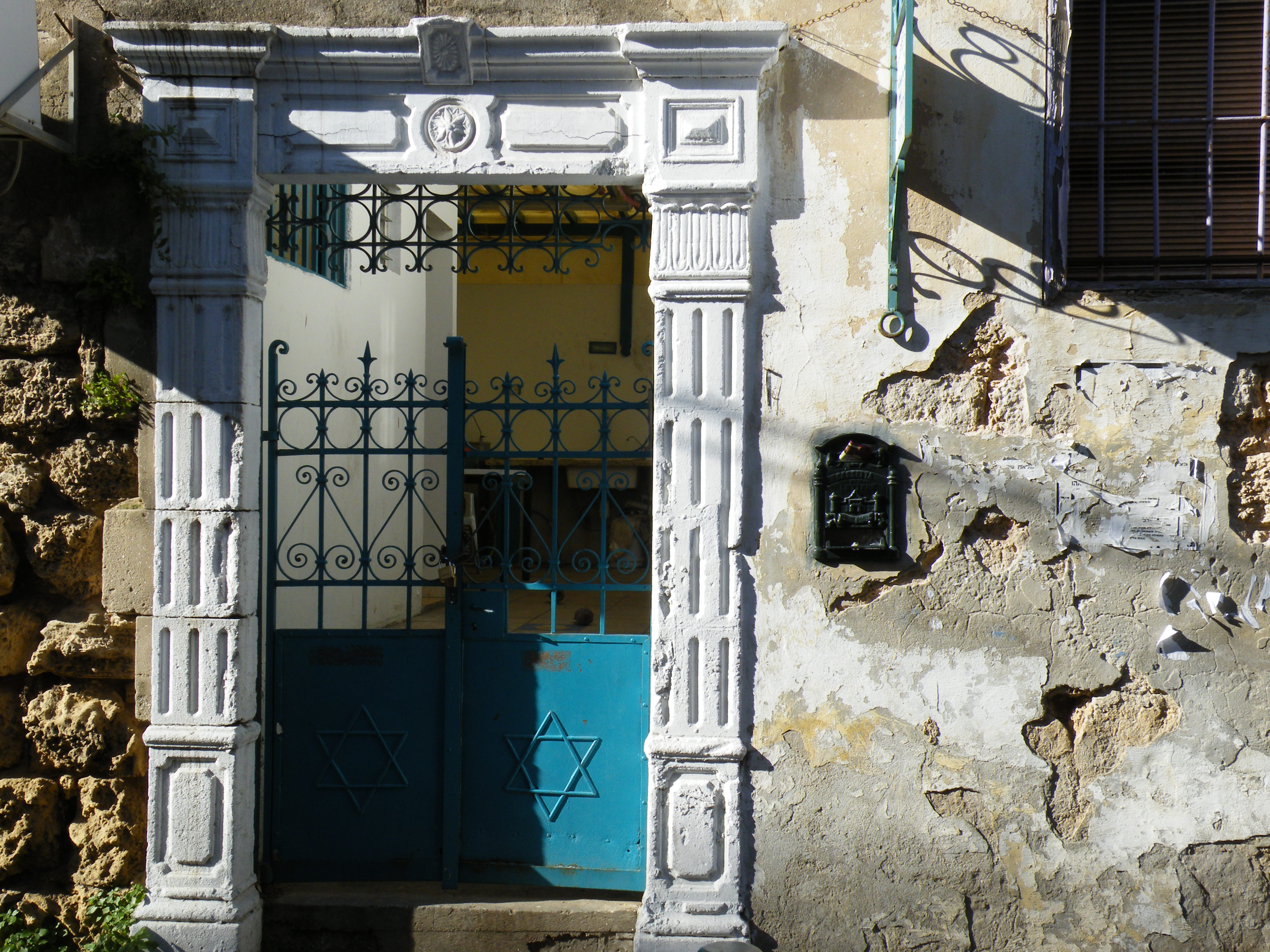
Synagogue door

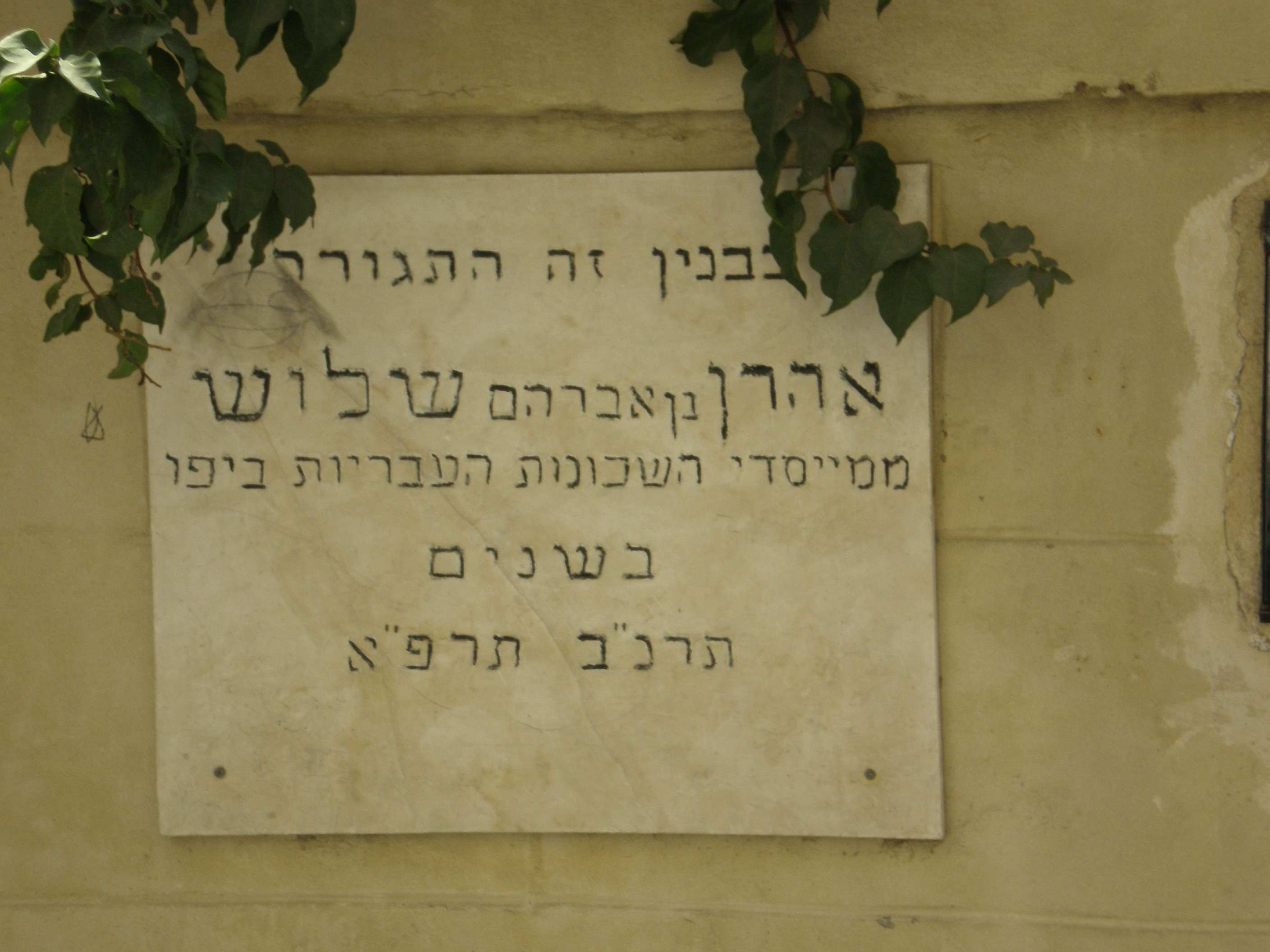
Chelouche House plaque
