= Uzda district =

District of Minsk region, Belarus

Uzda district Уздзенскі раён (Belarusian) Узденский район (Russian)
- District
- Flag Coat of arms

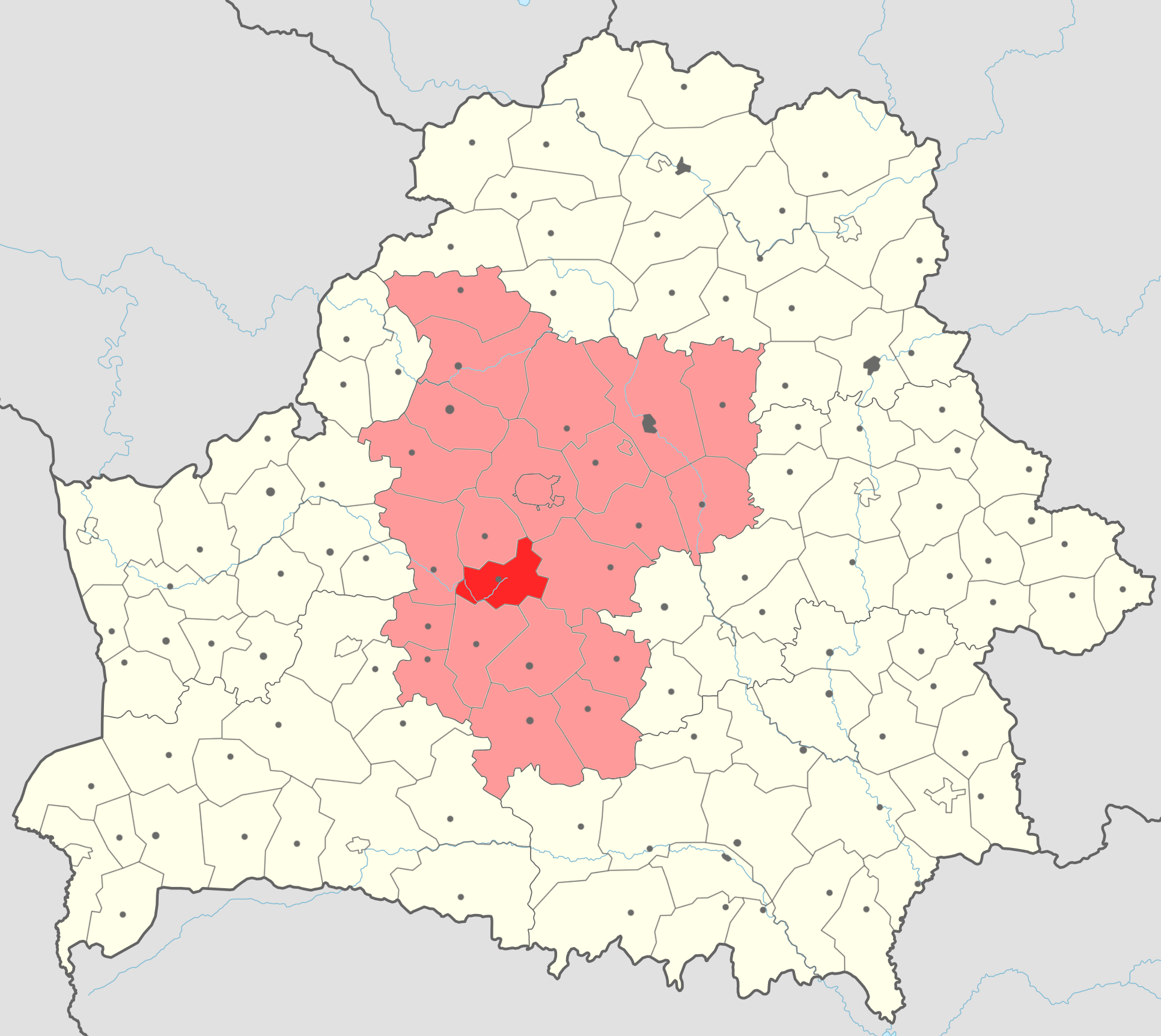
- Coordinates: 53°27′58″N 27°13′28″E
- Country: Belarus
- Region: Minsk region
- Administrative center: Uzda

Area
  - District: 1,180.97 km^{2} (455.98 sq mi)

Population (2024)
  - District: 23,776
  - Density: 20.133/km^{2} (52.143/sq mi)
  - Urban: 10,619
  - Rural: 13,157
- Time zone: UTC+3 (MSK)

Uzda district (Belarusian: Уздзенскі раён; Russian: Узденский район) is a district (raion) of Minsk region in Belarus. Its administrative center is Uzda. As of 2024, it has a population of 23,776.
