= Livro do Armeiro-Mor =

Illuminated manuscript

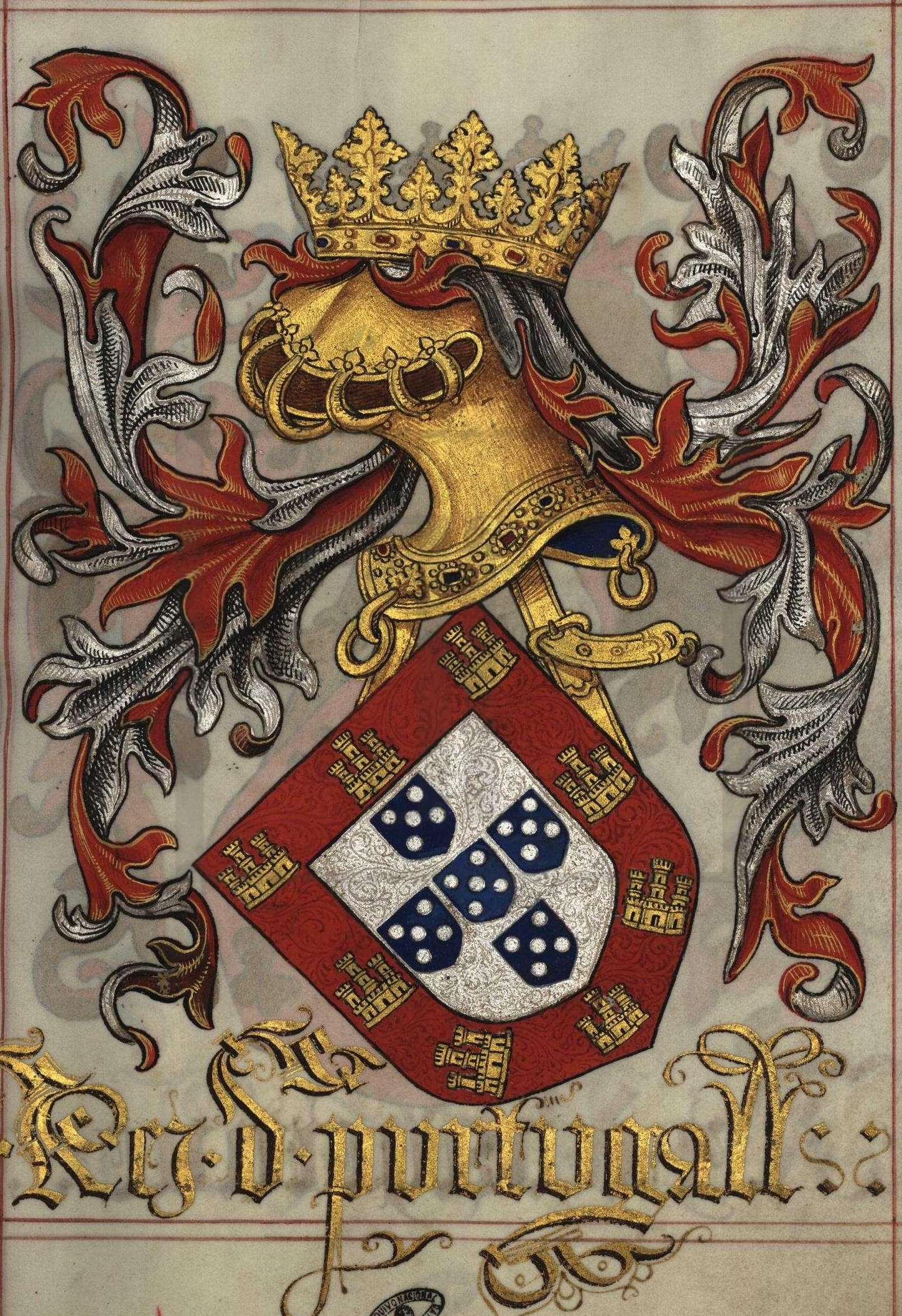
Livro do Armeiro-Mor, Arms of the King of Portugal (folio 10r)

The Livro do Armeiro-Mor (Portuguese pronunciation: [li.vɾu du ɐɾˈmɐj.ɾu mɔɾ], Book of the Chief Armourer) is an illuminated manuscript dating back to 1509, during the reign of King Manuel I of Portugal. The codex is an armorial, a collection of heraldic arms, authored by the King of Arms João do Cró. It is considered one of the masterpieces of illuminated manuscripts preserved in Portugal, alongside, for example, the Apocalypse of Lorvão, from the 12th century, the Book of Hours of King Duarte, or the contemporary Bible of the Jerónimos Monastery and Book of Hours of Manuel I, also produced for the Venturoso. Being the oldest surviving Portuguese armorial to this day, being the oldest source we have regarding certain arms, and also for the beauty of its magnificent illuminations, it is considered the most important Portuguese armorial. It has been called the "supreme monument of what we can call Portuguese heraldic culture."

The work is called this because it was entrusted to the custody of the Chief Armourer, Álvaro da Costa, appointed in 1511, in whose family the position and the custody of the book remained for more than ten generations. For this reason, the Livro do Armeiro-Mor escaped the great 1755 Lisbon earthquake, which destroyed, among many other things, the Chancellery of Nobility. The book was also the origin of the Book of Nobility and Perfection of Arms, still in the first half of the 16th century. The Thesouro de Nobreza, in the third quarter of the 17th century, somewhat followed the model of João do Cró's work.

This article lists all the nearly four hundred arms in the Livro do Armeiro-Mor, in the exact order in which they are presented in the five chapters of the work.

== Characteristics ==
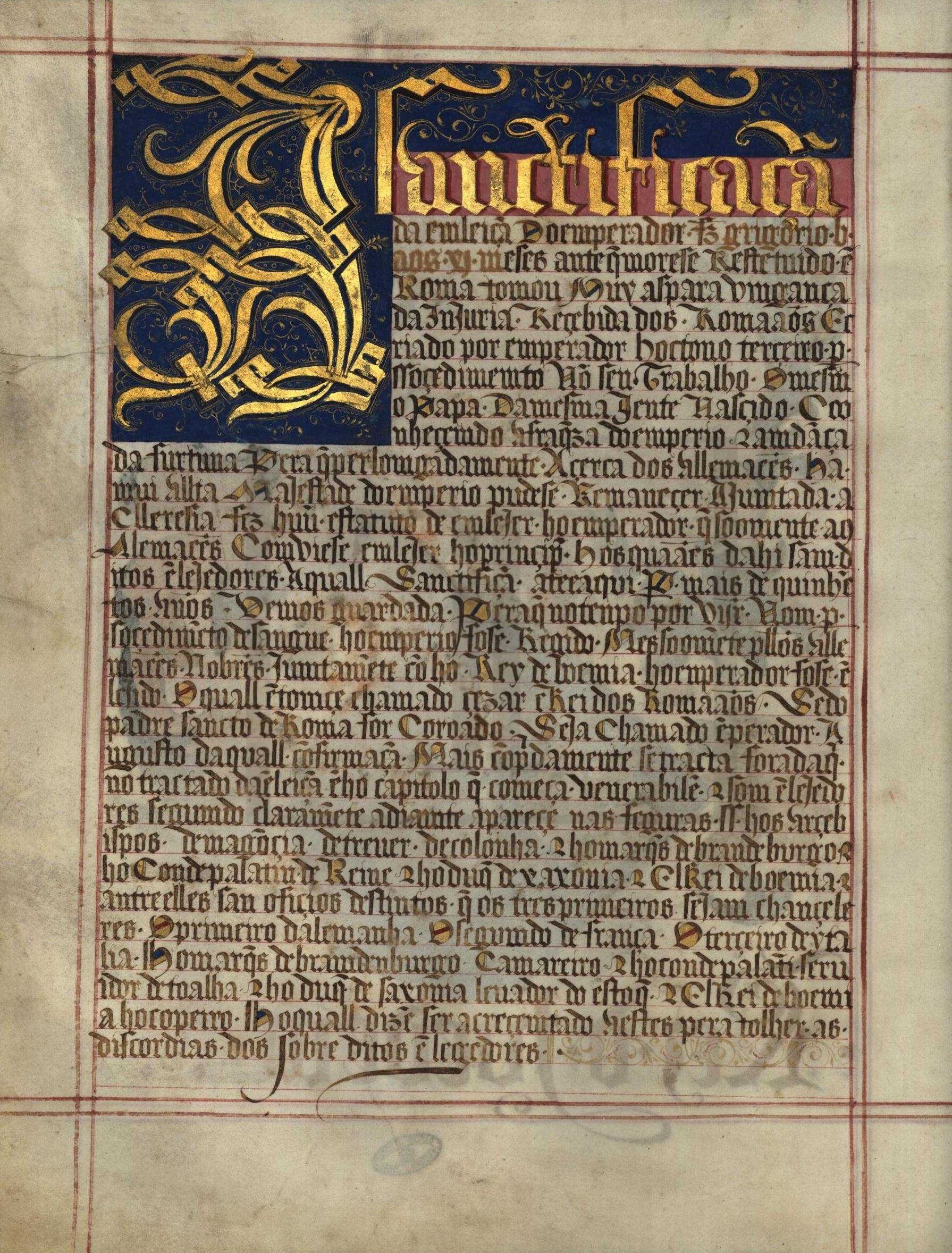
Sanctification of the Election of the Emperor. Beginning of the chapter on the election of the Emperor of Germany (folio 30r) (See below)

The Livro do Armeiro-Mor contains 161 folios of parchment, with dimensions of 403 x 315 mm, and is written in Portuguese. At the end of the monarchy, it belonged to the private library of King Carlos. Today it is preserved in the national archive of the Torre do Tombo Archive (Royal House reference, Chancellery of Nobility, book 19).

The book was commissioned by King Manuel I, as can be read at the beginning of the work:

Livro das Armas//que ho muyto alto//...//elrey Dom Manuell//...//mandou a my rey darmas Portuguall//juiz da nobreza que compossese e hordenasse//e nelle asentasse tadallas armas dos reys e princepes cristaãos// e asy udeus mouros e gentijos//domde primeiramente decendeo e começou a nobreza//a asy asentasse e possese todallas armas dos nobres destes reynos e senhorios cada//huuas em seu luguar proprio//...

It is therefore an official and normative book, resulting from the attempt of a monarch to regulate the use of heraldic arms in his kingdom:

King Manuel I, through a series of fundamental legislative reforms, managed to carry out... what King John I had initiated but had failed to complete. The publication of the Ordinations, the reform of the charters, the reform of justice, the reform of finance... are, among others, manifestations of the monarch's unifying and centralizing criterion. And from this criterion, the Hall of Coats of Arms and its great contemporaneous armorials also reflect it. Reflections because the prince ceases to articulate with the nobles and lords as great landholders, difficult to control, in order to pass, only, to have them as servants of the crown...

The same King Manuel I later had the Hall of Coats of Arms painted in Sintra, whose ceiling is decorated with the arms of the 72 most important lineages of the kingdom. All the arms represented in the Hall of Sintra are also found in the Livro do Armeiro-Mor. Very significantly, practically all the noble titles conferred in Portugal during the Ancien Régime until the end of the 18th century were conferred on one of these 72 lineages, which shows how the Livro do Armeiro-Mor is a mirror of the extraordinarily stable elite of Portuguese society at that time within the European context.

The Livro do Armeiro-Mor is a general armorial - because it includes arms from the entire kingdom - and universal - because it also includes arms from other kingdoms, whether real or imaginary. It does not include descriptions of the arms.

The volume contains an index that divides the work into five chapters (see below). After legendary and European arms, the body of the book deals with the arms of the Royal House of Portugal and the main families of the kingdom, a total of 287 Portuguese arms. The Portuguese arms are arranged in descending order of importance, starting with the lineages of the old or immemorial nobility, some dating back to the time of the County of Portugal. The book presents one coat of arms per page in the sections that present the legendary, foreign, or main nobility arms of the kingdom. In the last section of the book, four coats of arms of minor or more recent lineages are presented per page.

The analysis of the Livro do Armeiro-Mor is extensive. The work was published in 1956 by the Portuguese Academy of History, accompanied by the most important study of it to this day. This work is currently out of print. More recently, the same academy published a second edition in 2007, which reproduces excerpts from the 1956 study and includes the latest research on the subject. The most important study of the lineages presented in the Livro do Armeiro-Mor remains the work Brasões da Sala de Sintra, in three volumes, by Anselmo Braamcamp Freire. More recently, José Augusto Sotto Mayor Pizarro published his doctoral thesis, Linhagens Medievais Portuguesas: Genealogies and Strategies 1279-1325, in three volumes, in which we can follow the path of some of these lineages during the reign of King Denis.

=== Author's nationality ===
The authorship of the work has been disputed, mainly the nationality of the King of Arms Portugal, with an English Master Harriet, a Portuguese bachelor named António Rodrigues, and a Frenchman named Jean du Cros being suggested. According to the comments on the most recent edition of the work, the first two are definitively ruled out, and the Portuguese nationality of João do Cró seems to be confirmed.

=== Helms and mantlings ===
The Livro do Armeiro-Mor stands out for not presenting the crests of the respective arms - only inscribing the word crest above 86 of the Portuguese shields, in the last section of the work -, giving all attention to the shield and only ornamenting it with helmets and magnificent mantlings, and a torse. Since the shield is the absolutely fundamental element of heraldic arms, this can be considered a tradition that gives due importance to the shield and, by keeping the arms simple and limited to the essentials, gives them great dignity. However, in the subsequent Book of Nobility and Perfection of Arms, by António Godinho, whose initiative was due to King Manuel I but was only completed during the reign of King John III, the respective crests were also represented.

Several models of mantlings have been identified in the work, and seven models of mantling, three of which adorn 190 of the arms, and the remaining four only 24. As for the helmets that top the shields, there seem to be no criteria, in the case of noble Houses, regarding the use of gold helmets (34 cases) and silver helmets. "...only one explanation remains. The illuminator did not respect any rule in choosing the metals or colors and the shape of the elements outside the shield. The choices were based solely on artistic criteria, due to the inspiration and creativity of the artist." As the same author mentions, this was relatively common in armorials of the time.

Certain minor errors in João do Cró's work were corrected by António Godinho, whose work, although not without errors, "should be preferred in establishing the Portuguese armorial". The Livro do Armeiro-Mor, however, is unquestionably the reference work for heraldic art.

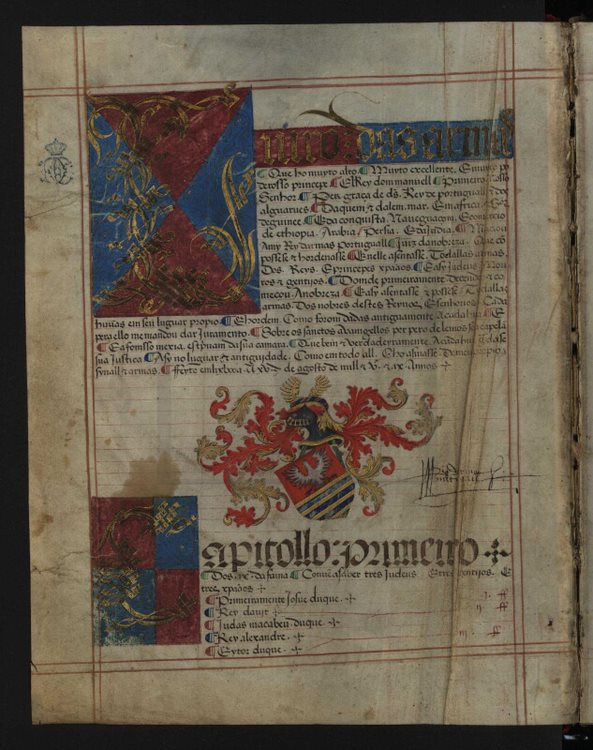
Opening signed by the King

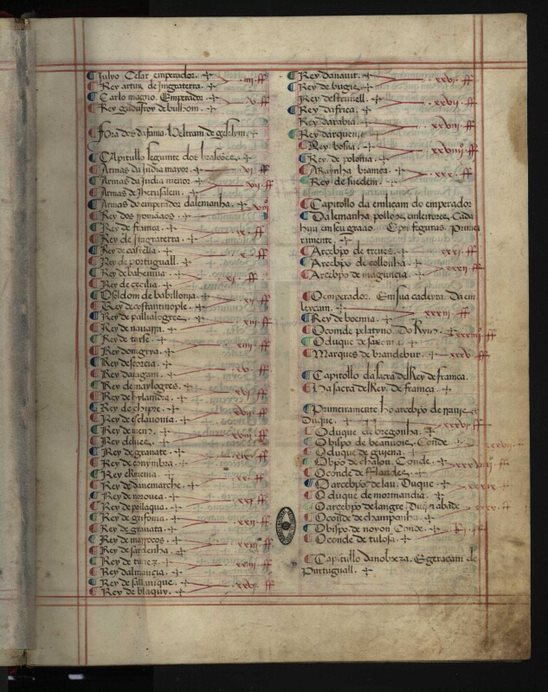
Index Part 1

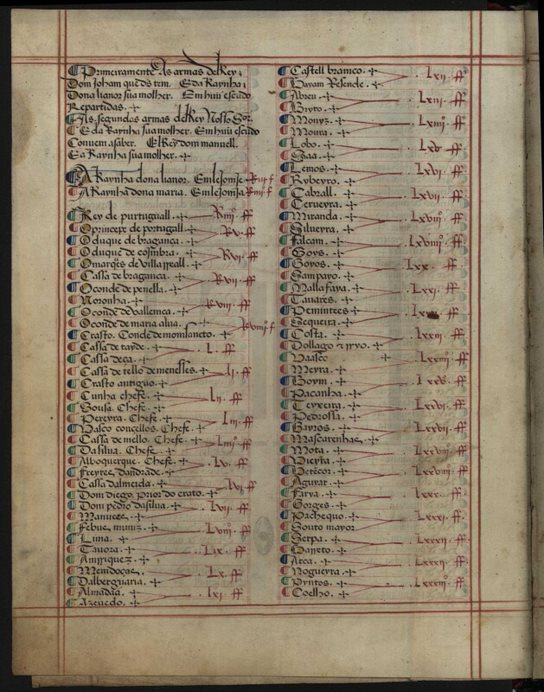
Index Part 2

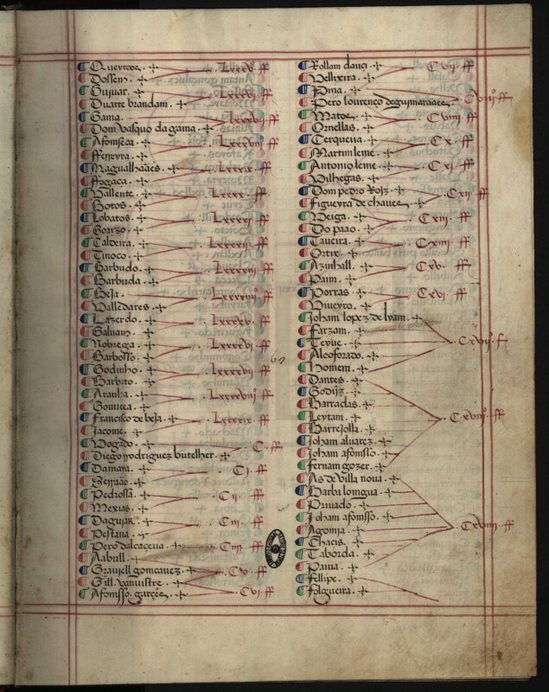
Index Part 3

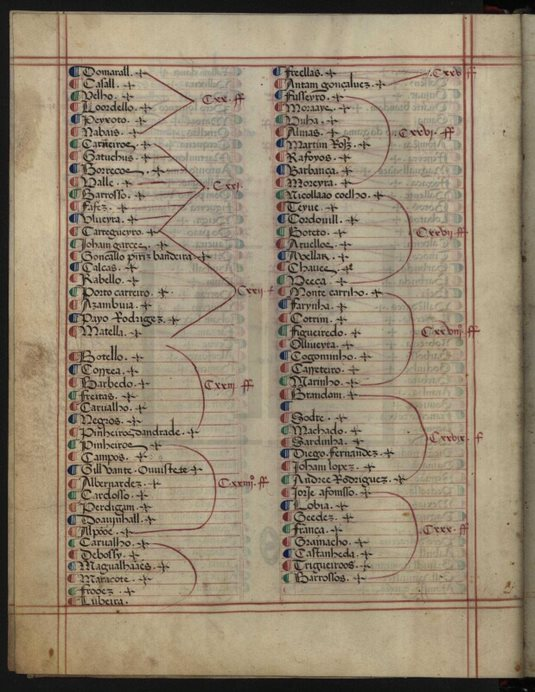
Index Part 4

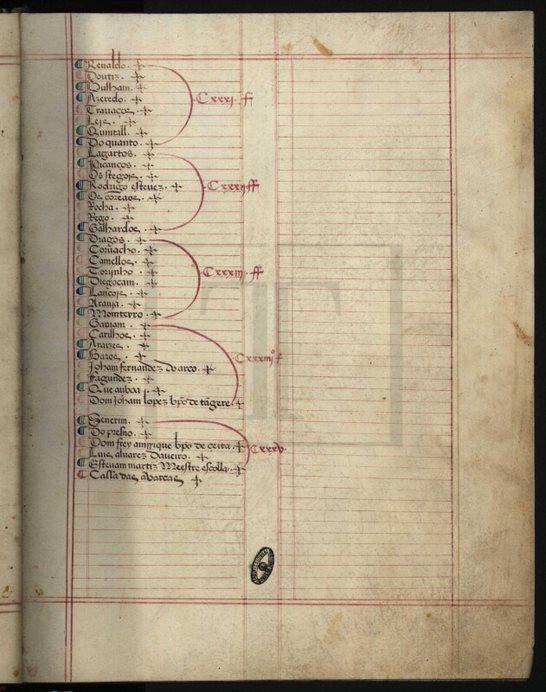
Index Part 5

== First Chapter of the Nine of Fame ==
The first chapter of the Livro do Armeiro-Mor presents the arms of the so-called Nine of Fame, historical or legendary heroes of great renown, and also a figure outside the Nine of Fame. In total, ten beautifully illuminated pages, where each shield is presented alongside a figure, although the arms are largely fantastical. The heroes of Fame are divided into three groups of three: three Hebrew kings, three Pagan kings, and three Christian kings. The order of presentation of the ten figures is chronological, except among the pagans, where Hector, the legendary prince of Troy, is presented after Alexander the Great. The other legendary figure is King Arthur, who heads the list of the Christian heroes.

The figure outside the Nine of Fame represents Bertrand du Guesclin, constable of France during the Hundred Years' War.

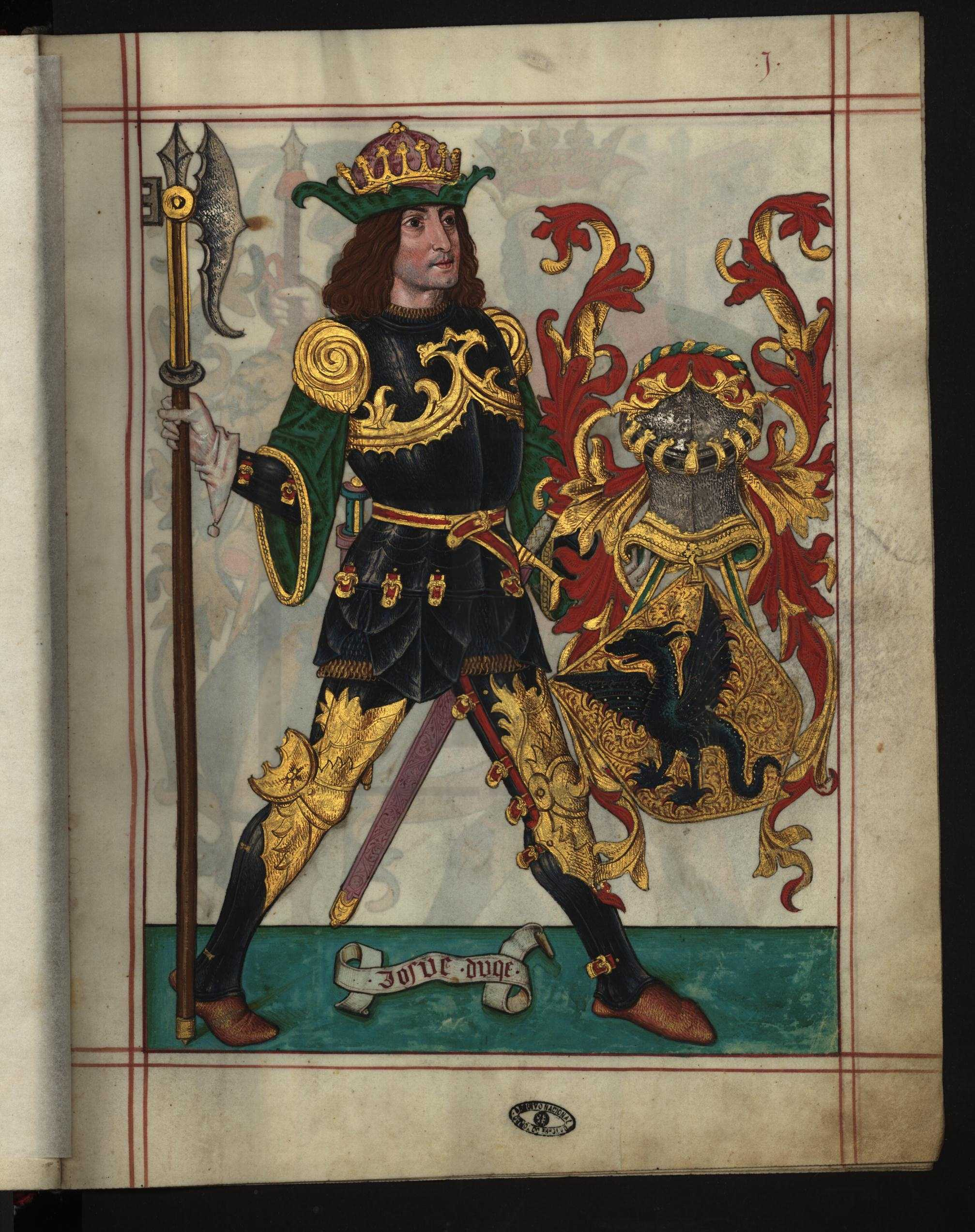
Joshua (folio 1)

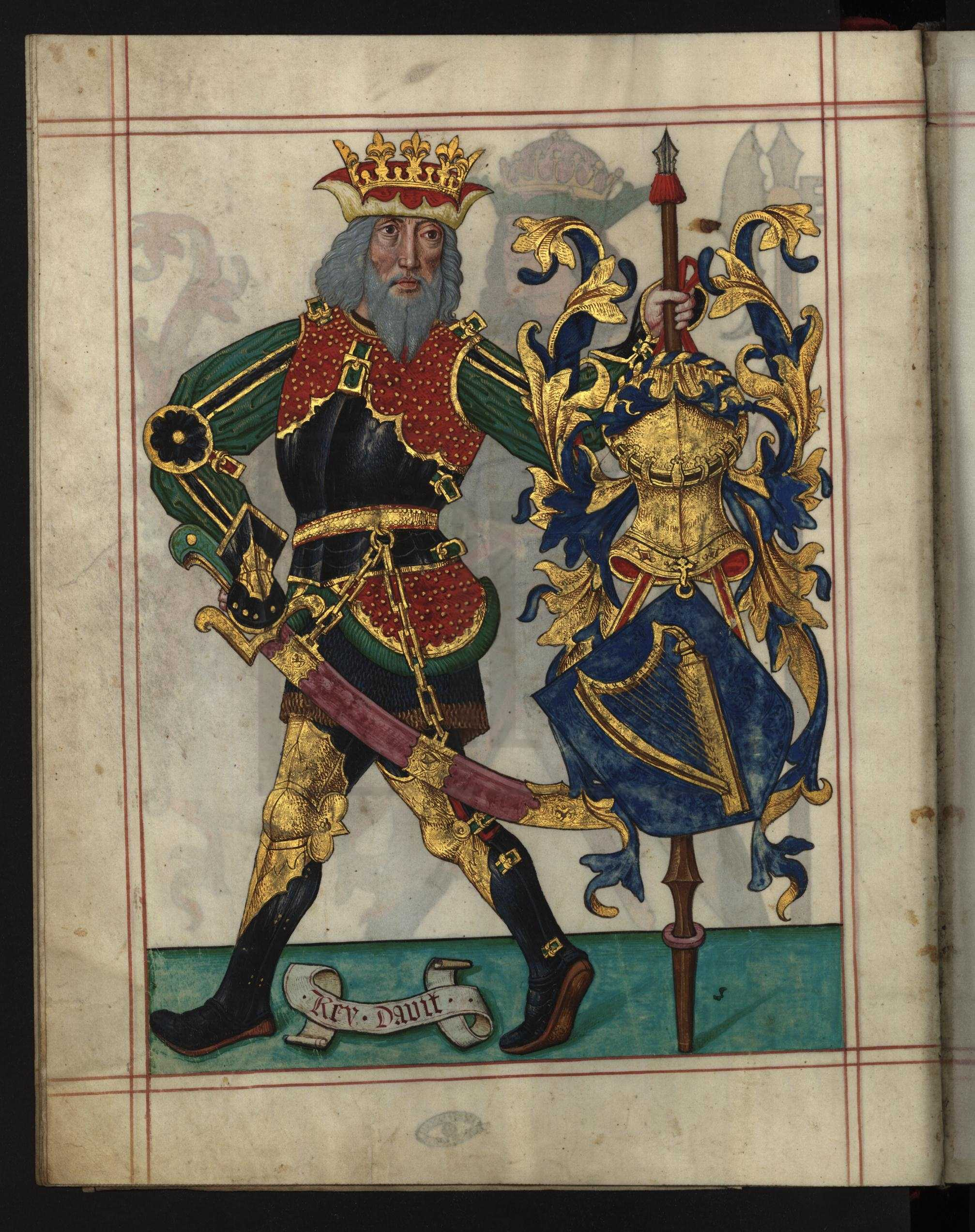
David (folio 1v)

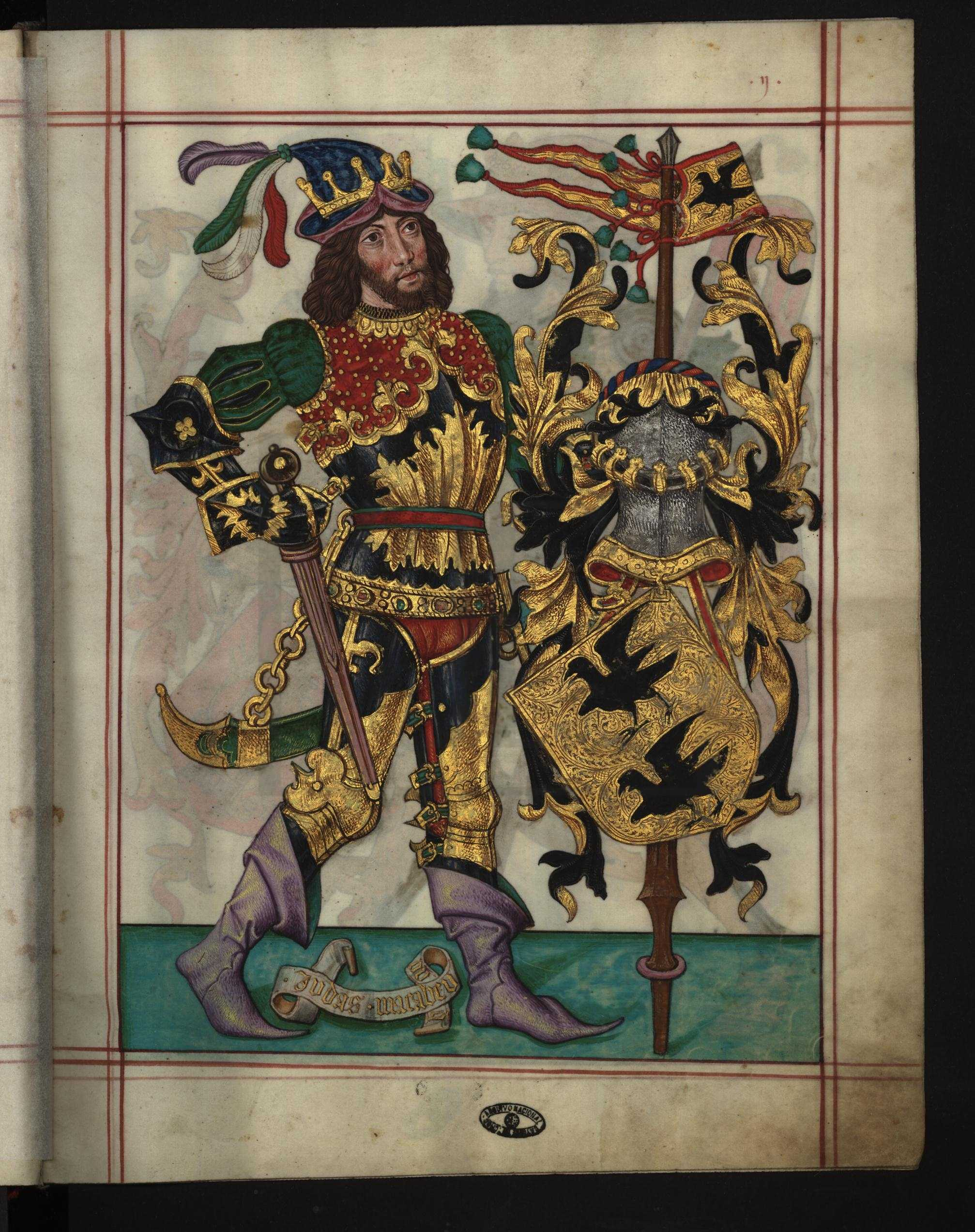
Judas Maccabeus (folio 2)

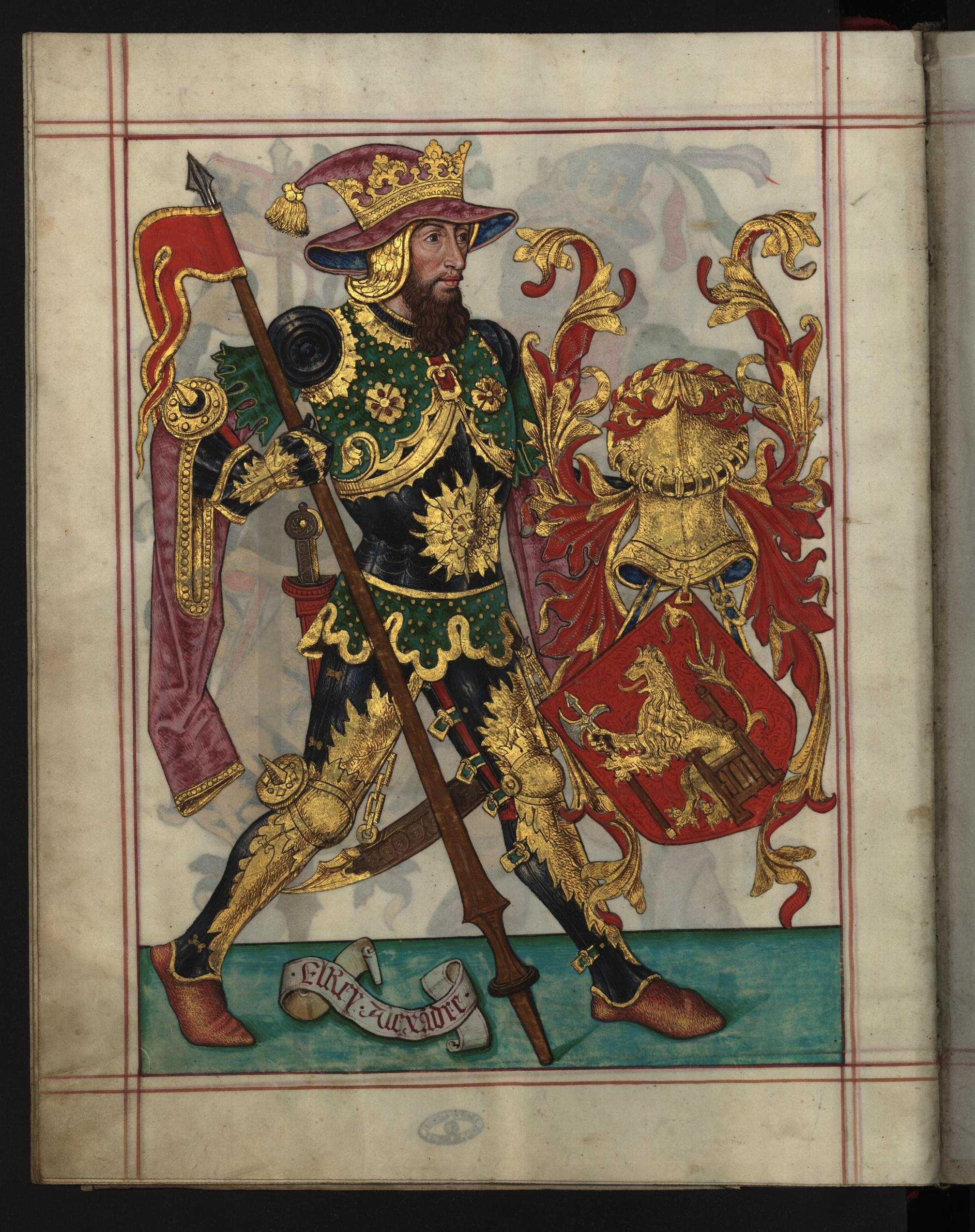
Alexander the Great (folio 2v)

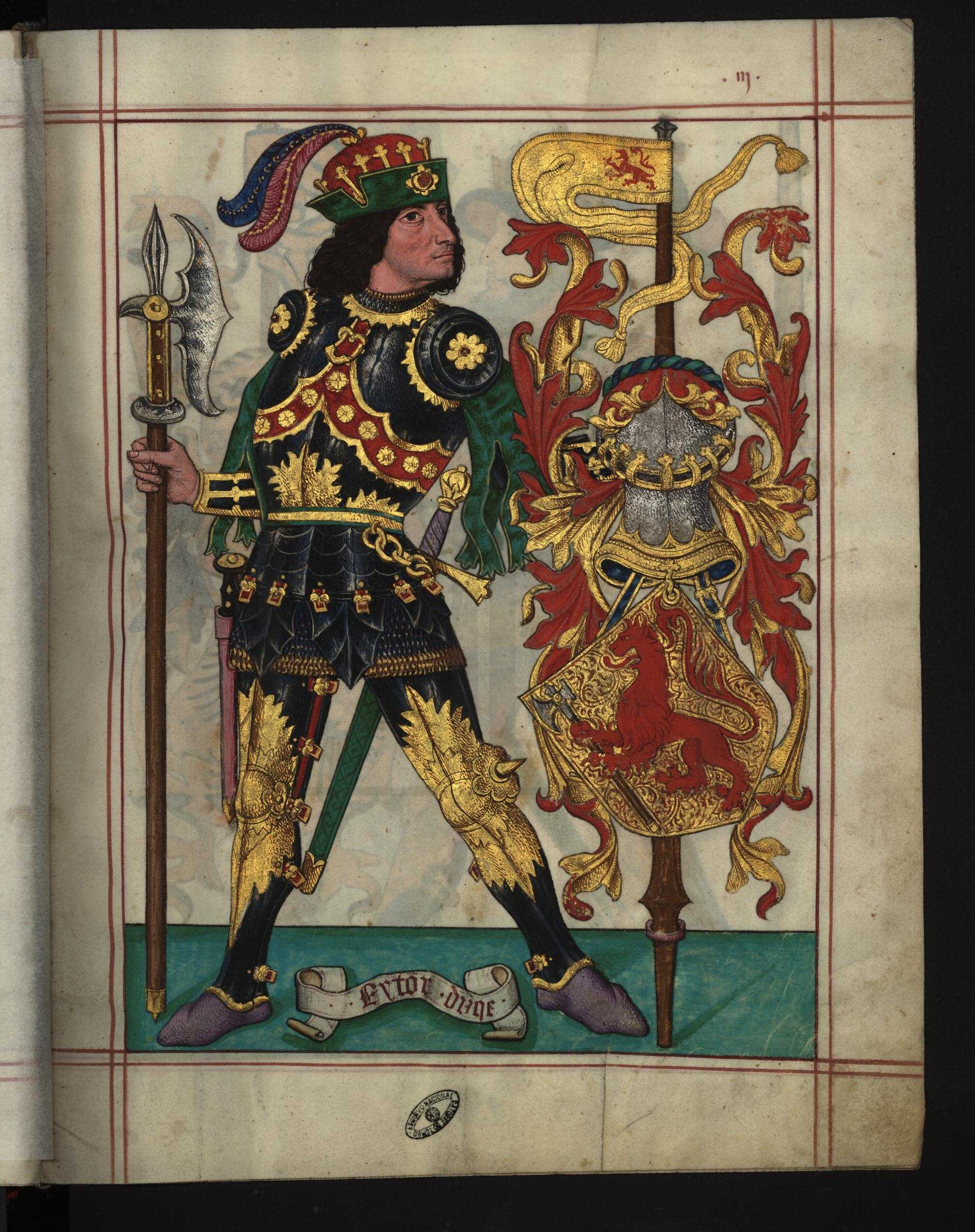
Hector (folio 3)

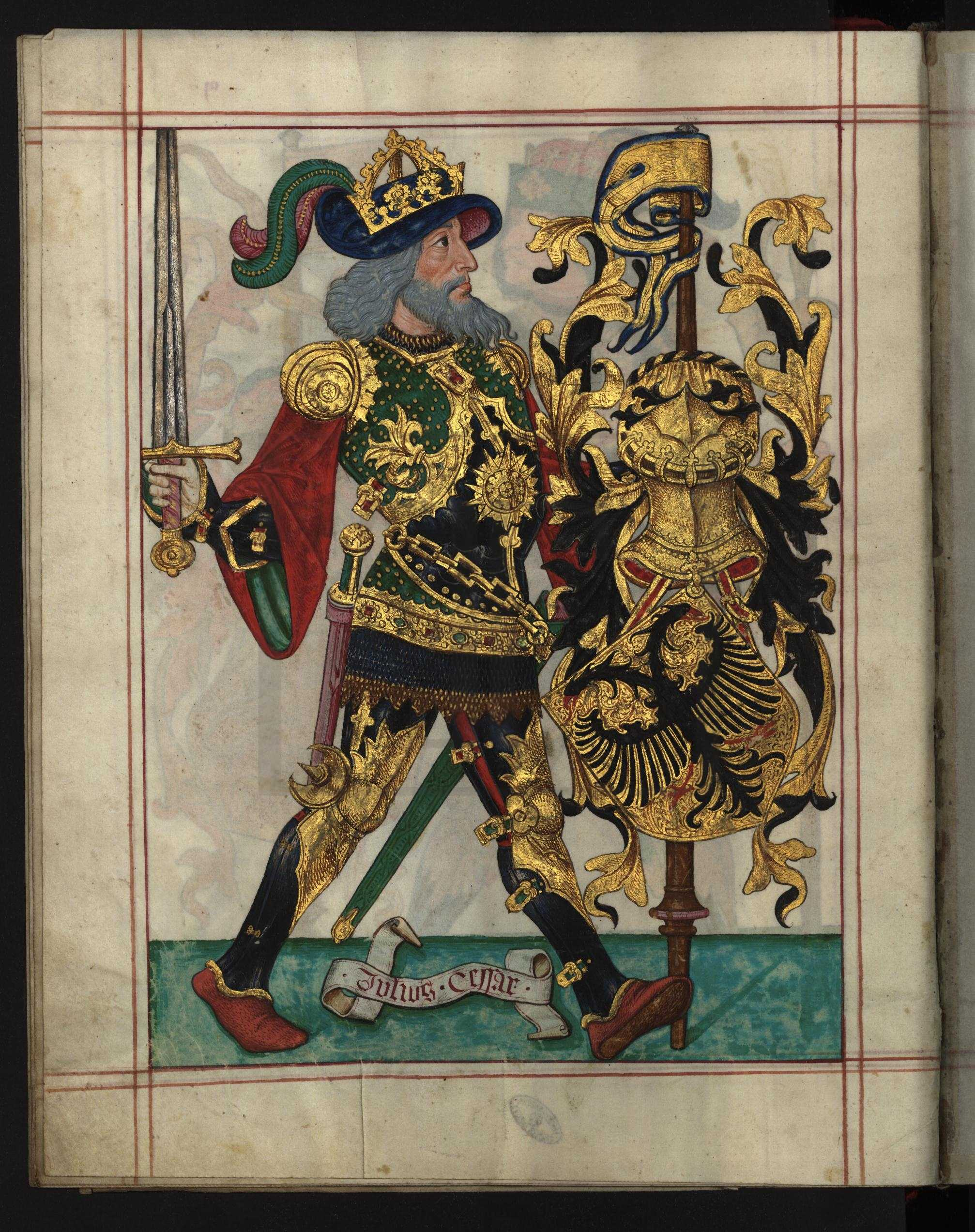
Julius Caesar (folio 3v)

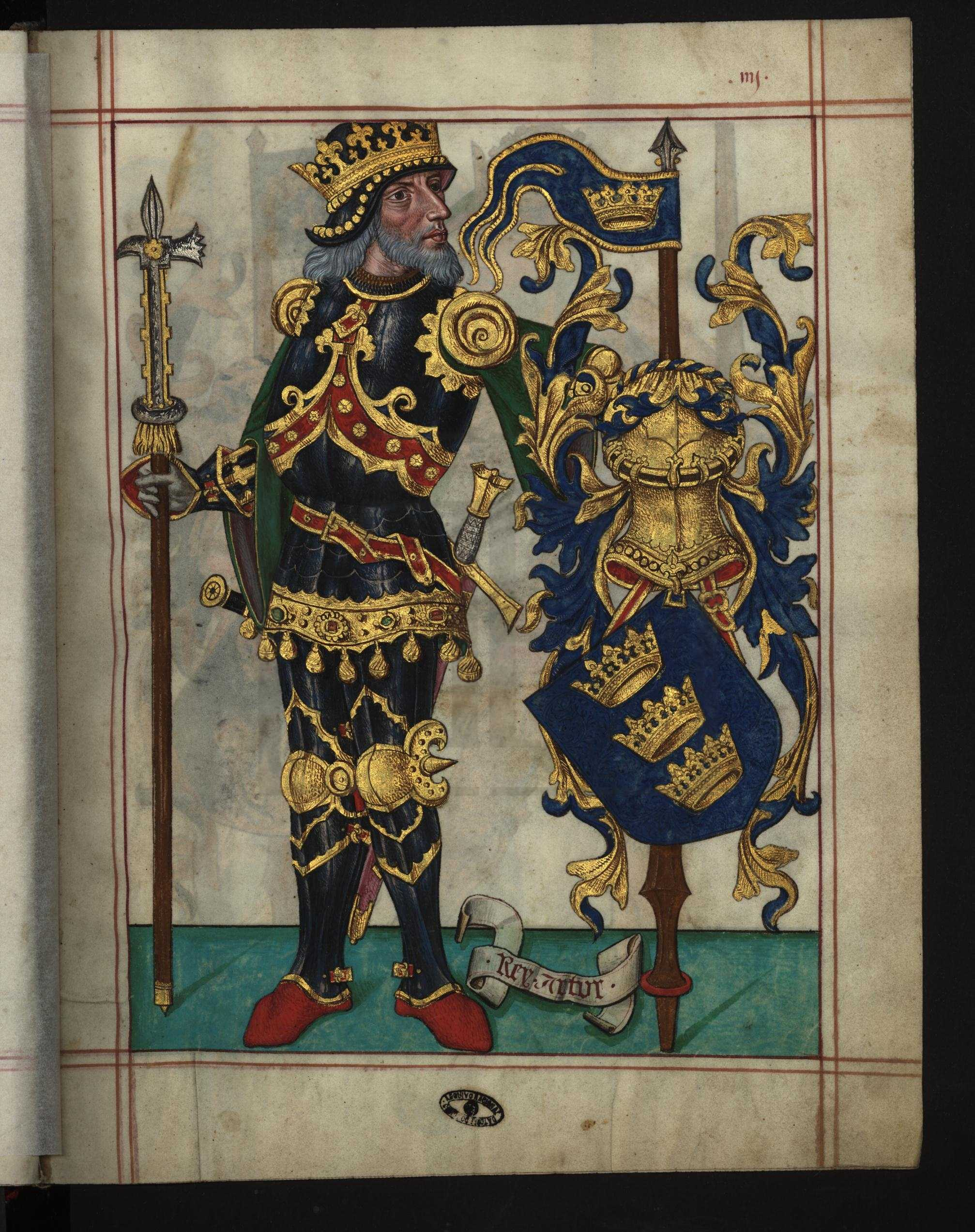
King Arthur (folio 4)

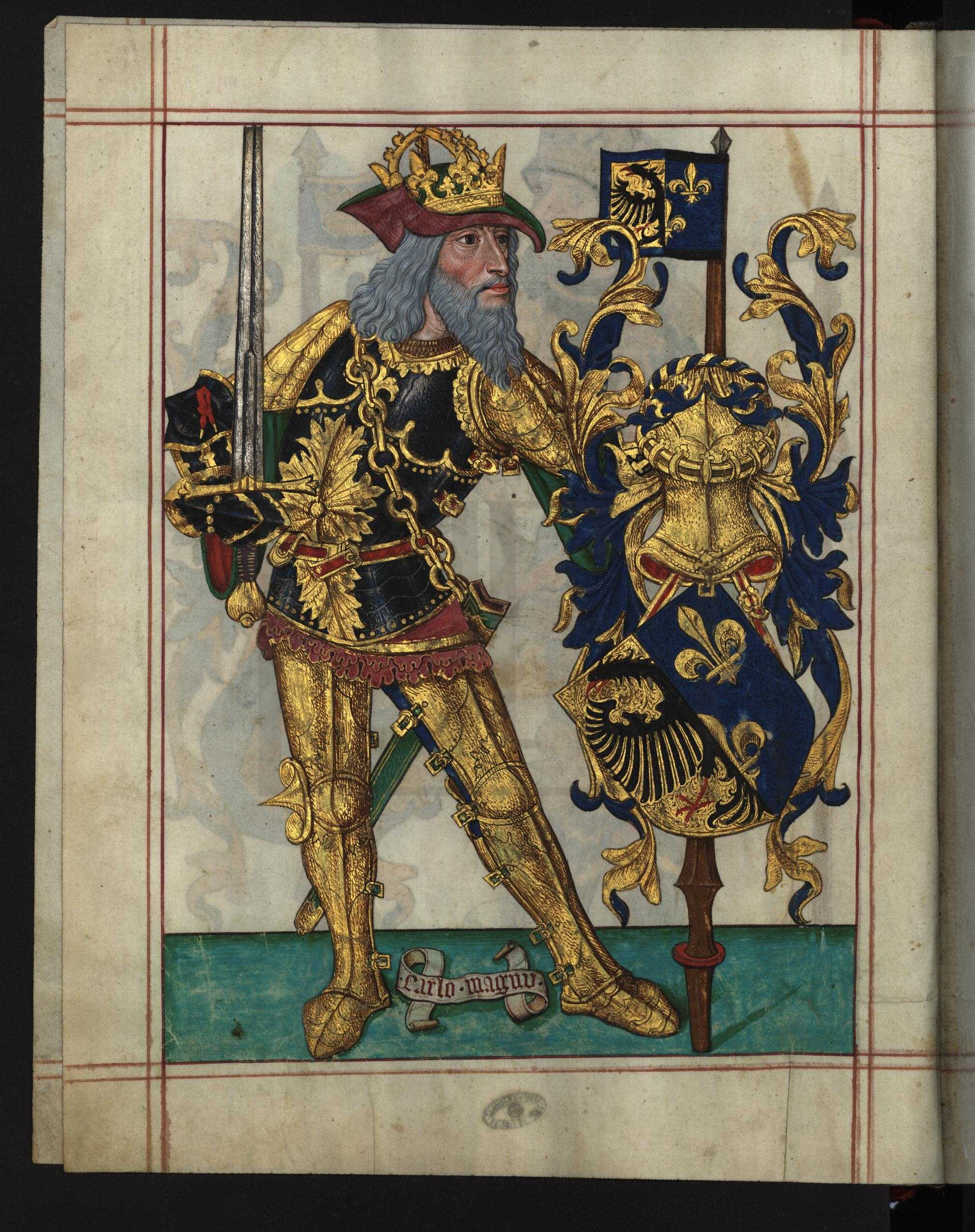
Charlemagne (folio 4v)

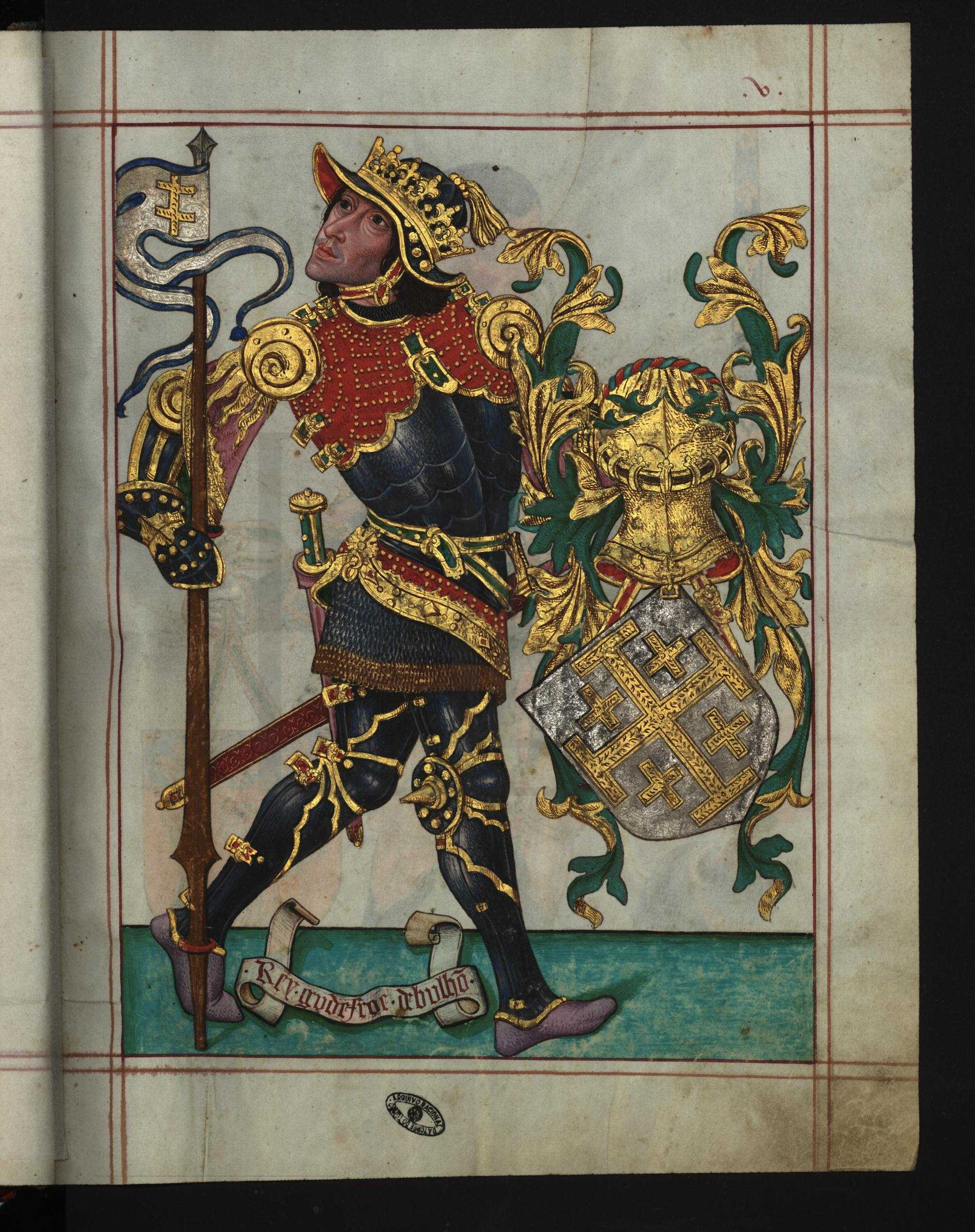
Godefroy de Bouillon (folio 5)

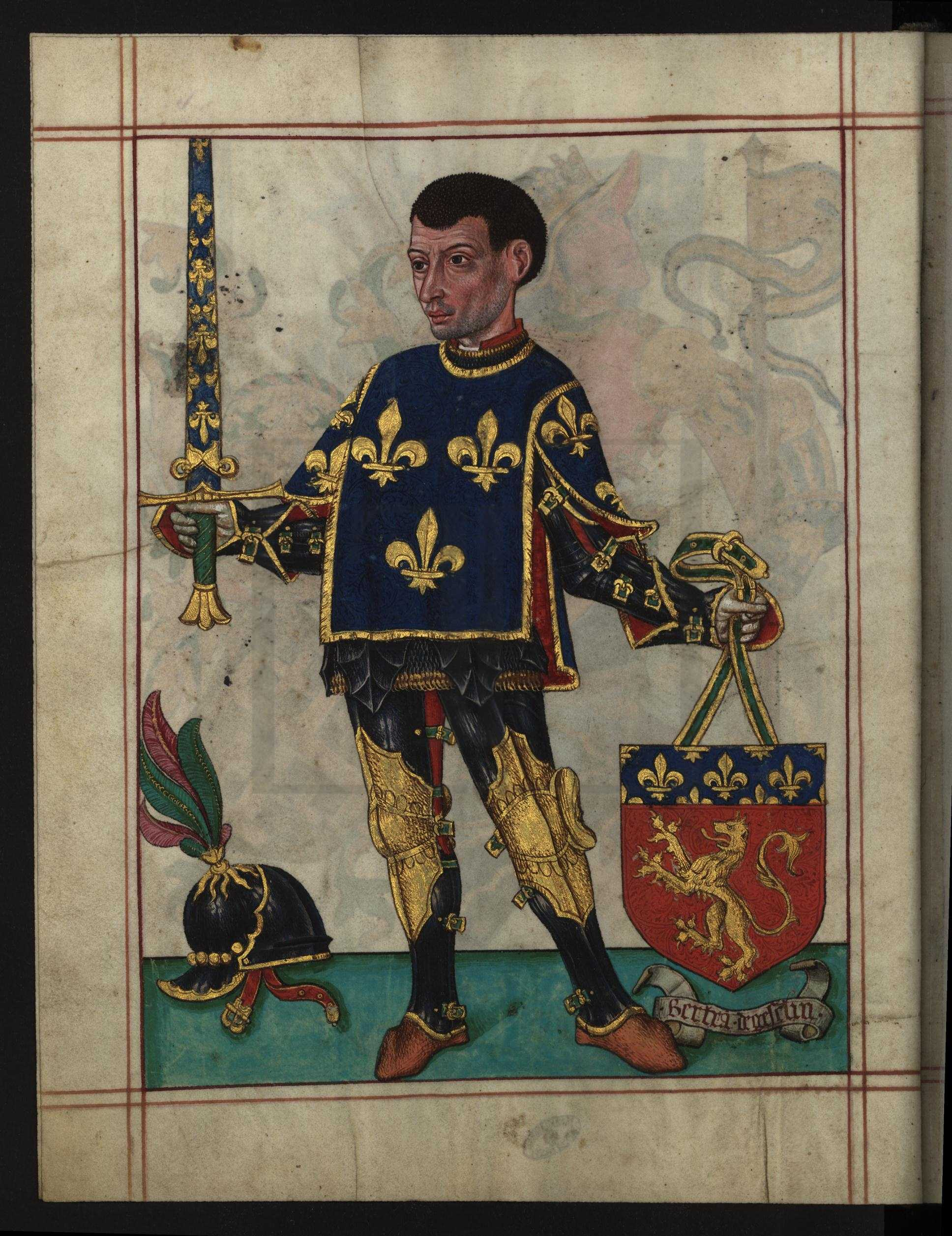
Bertrand du Guesclin (folio 5v)

== Following Chapter of the Coats of Arms ==
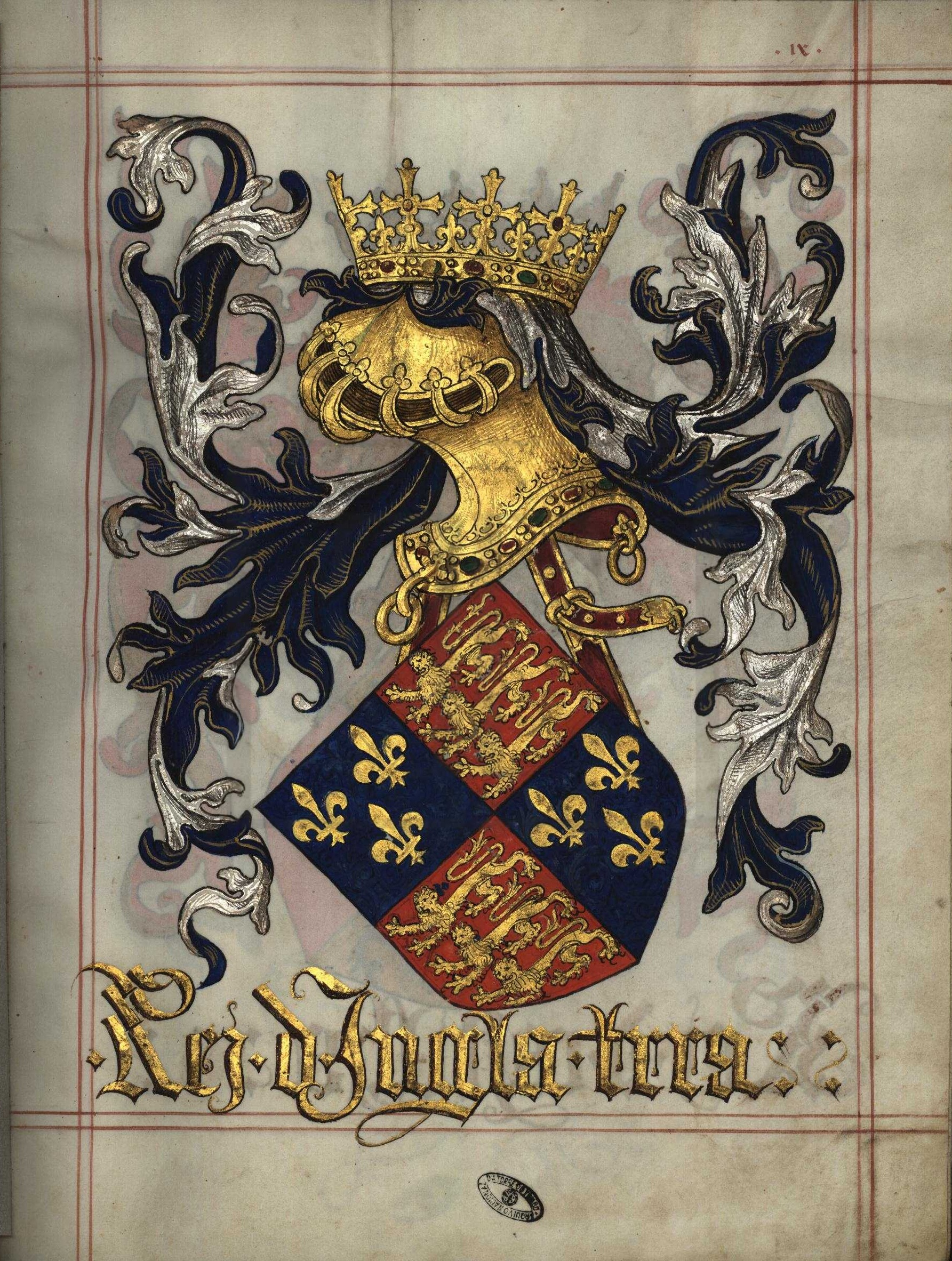
Arms of the King of England (folio 9r)

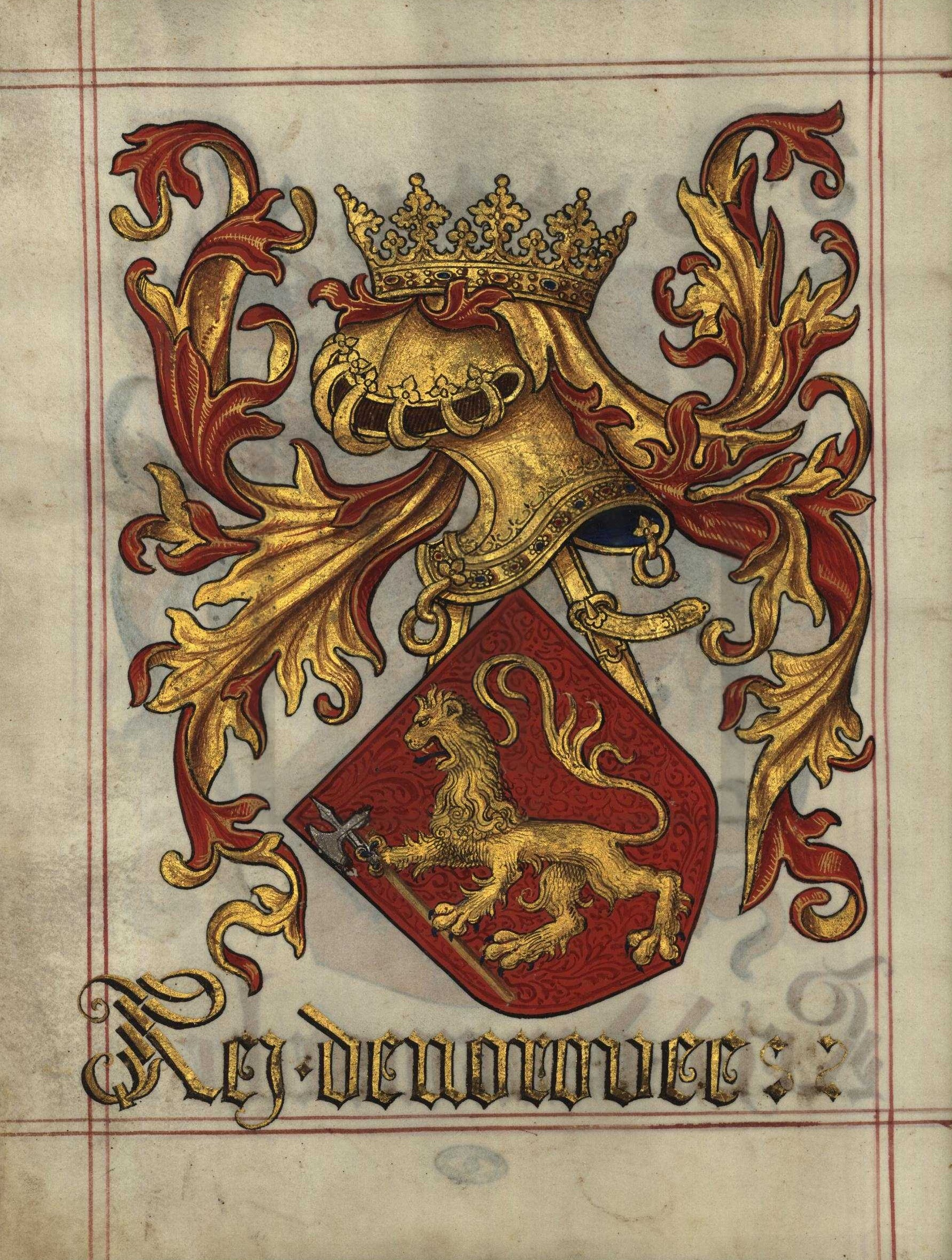
Arms of the King of Norway (folio 20v)

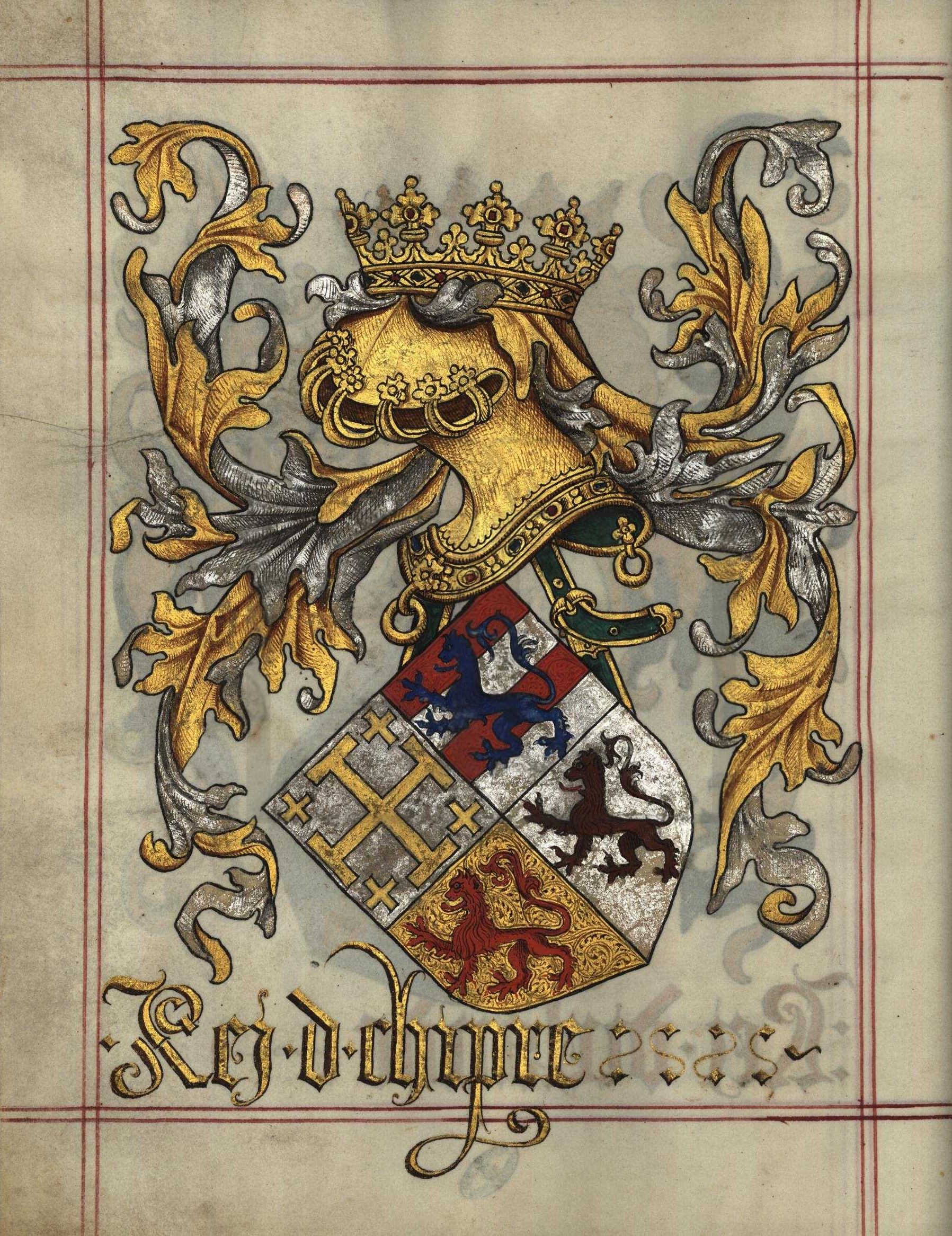
Arms of the King of Cyprus (folio 16v)

The States of Europe, Asia, and Africa

The following chapter of the work, titled "of the Coats of Arms" in the index, presents the arms of 49 major and minor states, on an equal number of pages. Among these states are the main kingdoms of Western Europe, including the kingdoms of the British Isles and Scandinavia. We also find certain historical arms of kingdoms that no longer existed at the time of the execution of the work in 1509, namely three Christian kingdoms of the Holy Land founded during the era of the Crusades: the Kingdom of Jerusalem, the Armenian Kingdom of Cilicia, and the Kingdom of Cyprus. Similarly, we find the arms of the Byzantine Empire and the Palaiologos dynasty, the last dynasty of the Empire.

Finally, in this chapter, similar to what was seen in the first chapter, we find arms of kingdoms or legendary figures, such as the White Queen. Some of these legendary, more or less fantastical, or unidentified arms are represented in the following list in italics.

These illuminations, unlike the previous ones, do not present figures but only the shields, hung from a crowned helmet and mantlings.

- Greater India (folio 6r)
- Lesser India (folio 6v)
- King of Jerusalem (folio 7r)
- Emperor of Germany (folio 7v)
- King of the Romans (folio 8r)
- King of France (folio 8v)
- King of England (folio 9r)
- King of Castile (folio 9v)
- King of Portugal (folio 10r)
- King of Bohemia (folio 10v)
- King of Sicily (folio 11r)
- Sultan of Babylon (folio 11v) (Note: Cairo was known as Babylon to medieval europeans)
- King of Constantinople (folio 12r)
- King of Palaiologos (folio 12v)
- King of Navarre (folio 13r)
- King of Tarso (folio 13v)
- King of Hungary (folio 14r)
- King of Scotland (folio 14v)
- King of Aragon (folio 15r)
- King of Mailogres (folio 15v)
- King of Ireland (folio 16r)
- King of Cyprus (folio 16v)
- King of Clavomnia (folio 17r)
- King of Mens (folio 17v)
- King of Elves (folio 18r)
- King of Granada (folio 18v)
- King of Conimbra (folio 19r)
- King of Armenia (folio 19v)
- King of Denmark (folio 20r)
- King of Norway (folio 20v)
- King of Poland (folio 21r)
- King of "Grifonia" (Pomerania or Greece) (folio 21v)
- King of Gravate (folio 22r)
- King of Morocco (folio 22v)
- King of Sardinia (folio 23r)
- King of Tunis (folio 23v)
- King of Dalmatia (folio 24r)
- King of Thessaloniki (folio 24v)
- King of Wallachia (folio 25r)
- King of Danamt (folio 25v)
- King of Bugia (folio 26r)
- King of Estunell (folio 26v)
- King of Africa (folio 27r)
- King of Arabia (folio 27v)
- King of the Orkneys (folio 28r)
- King of Bosnia (folio 28v)
- King of Poland (Coat of arms of Kalisz) (folio 29r)
- White Queen (folio 29v)
- King of Sweden (folio 30r)

== 'Chapter of the Election of the Emperor of Germany' ==
The Seven Electors of the Empire

The third chapter of the Book of the Grand Armorial deals with the election of the emperor of the Holy Roman Empire. The Empire was divided into hundreds of states of greater or lesser size; the emperor was elected by a select group of princes. The chapter begins with a written page describing the form of election in the Empire established by the Golden Bull of 1356, which was still in effect at the time the work was executed. The chapter then contains seven beautiful illuminations representing the coats of arms of the seven Prince-Electors of the Empire; as in the first chapter of the Nine Worthies, each shield is presented by a magnificently executed figure.

In addition to the seven Prince-Electors, the chapter also contains an eighth illumination representing the emperor seated on the imperial throne, holding a scepter and orb in his hands, and with the arms of four other dukes of the Empire at his feet, namely (from left to right): Duke of Swabia, Duke of Brunswick-Wolfenbüttel, Duke of Bavaria, and Duke of Lorraine. Note that the first two of these four coats of arms are inverted so that the lions of both are bent before the emperor, just like the eagles of Lorraine on the opposite side (see image gallery below).

All eight illuminations in this chapter were heavily inspired by - to the point of being considered mere copies of - a page from the Nuremberg Chronicle, authored by Hartmann Schedel. In this composition from 1493, which represents an important part of the hierarchy of the Empire, we can see the emperor in the center of his throne with figures practically identical to those of the Book of the Grand Armorial's seven Electors by his side (three on the left, four on the right), and with the same arms of four duchies at his feet, except for Bavaria, whose space is occupied by the lion of the Electorate of the Palatinate, which, like the others, bows before the emperor. Hartmann Schedel's composition also shows, in the lower parts, twenty-four other figures and the corresponding arms of other nobles of the Empire. For the Book of the Grand Armorial, João do Cró ignored these other minor figures and chose to represent the seven Electors and the emperor individually, thus being able to dedicate an entire page of the work to each one, without even changing their poses, attire, etc. - merely giving them, without a doubt, a much more splendid decoration (see image gallery below).

- Archbishop of Trier, Archchancellor of the Empire for Burgundy ("France") (fl 31^{r})
- Archbishop of Cologne, Archchancellor of the Empire for the Italian Kingdom ("Ytalia") (fl 31^{v})
- Archbishop of Mainz, Archchancellor of the Empire for Germany (fl 32^{r})
- Emperor of Germany (fl 32^{v})
- King of Bohemia, Archcupbearer of the Empire ("cup-bearer") (fl 33^{r})
- Count Palatine of the Rhine, Archsteward of the Empire ("towel-bearer") (fl 33^{v})
- Duke of Saxony, Archmarshal of the Empire ("spear-bearer") (fl 34^{r})
- Margrave of Brandenburg, Archchamberlain of the Empire ("chamberlain") (fl 34^{v})

== 'Chapter of the Coronation of the King of France' ==
The Twelve Peers of France

The fourth chapter of the work, like the previous one, begins with a short text, in this case about the coronation of the kings of France. In this solemn ceremony, the twelve peers of France - six ecclesiastics and six laymen, six of whom held the rank of duke and six that of count - each had the responsibility to carry, present, or affix certain objects, from the crown and scepter to the royal spurs and belt. The chapter contains twelve magnificent illuminations of the peers of France, headed by the Archbishop of Reims and the Duke of Burgundy, the first ecclesiastical and lay peers; each illumination shows their respective attribute (see image gallery below).

- Archbishop of Reims, Duke, anoints and crowns the king (fl 35^{v})
- Duke of Burgundy, carries the crown (fl 36^{r})
- Bishop of Beauvais, Count, carries the royal mantle (fl 36^{v})
- Duke of Aquitaine, carries the second banner (fl 37^{r})
- Bishop of Châlons, Count, carries the royal ring (fl 37^{v})
- Count of Flanders, carries the sword (fl 38^{r})
- Bishop of Laon, Duke, carries the Holy Ampulla with the anointing oil (fl 38^{v})
- Duke of Normandy, carries the first banner (fl 39^{r})
- Archbishop of Langres, Duke, carries the scepter (fl 39^{v})
- Count of Champagne, carries the royal standard (fl 40^{r})
- Bishop of Noyon, Count, carries the belt (fl 40^{v})
- Count of Toulouse, carries the spurs (fl 41^{r})

== 'Chapter of the Nobility and Generation of Portugal' ==
The body of the Book of the Grand Armorial deals with the noble Houses of Portugal, a total of 287 coats of arms, headed by the Royal House. After the Royal Family, the main Houses of the kingdom of Portugal are mentioned.

For a study of the most important noble lineages, see the Coats of Arms of the Hall of Sintra. For the relative importance of lineages at court in the 14th and 15th centuries and the fluctuations thereof, reflected in the order in which their arms are presented in the Book of the Grand Armorial, see, for example, the work of Rita Costa Gomes.

Some of the first Houses at the top of the list are referred to by the nobiliary particle of the family without explicitly mentioning the family itself. However, not all titles existing in 1509 are mentioned. In the following, except for the various titles associated with the Houses of Braganza and Vila Real, the respective Houses or titles associated with the Houses existing in 1509 are added in parentheses.

Note: The following maintains the correspondence and spelling of the latest edition of the Book of the Grand Armorial (2007). Thus, FEBUS MUNJS = Moniz de Lusignan, BETENCOR = Bethancourt, etc.

=== Princes and Main Houses of Portugal ===
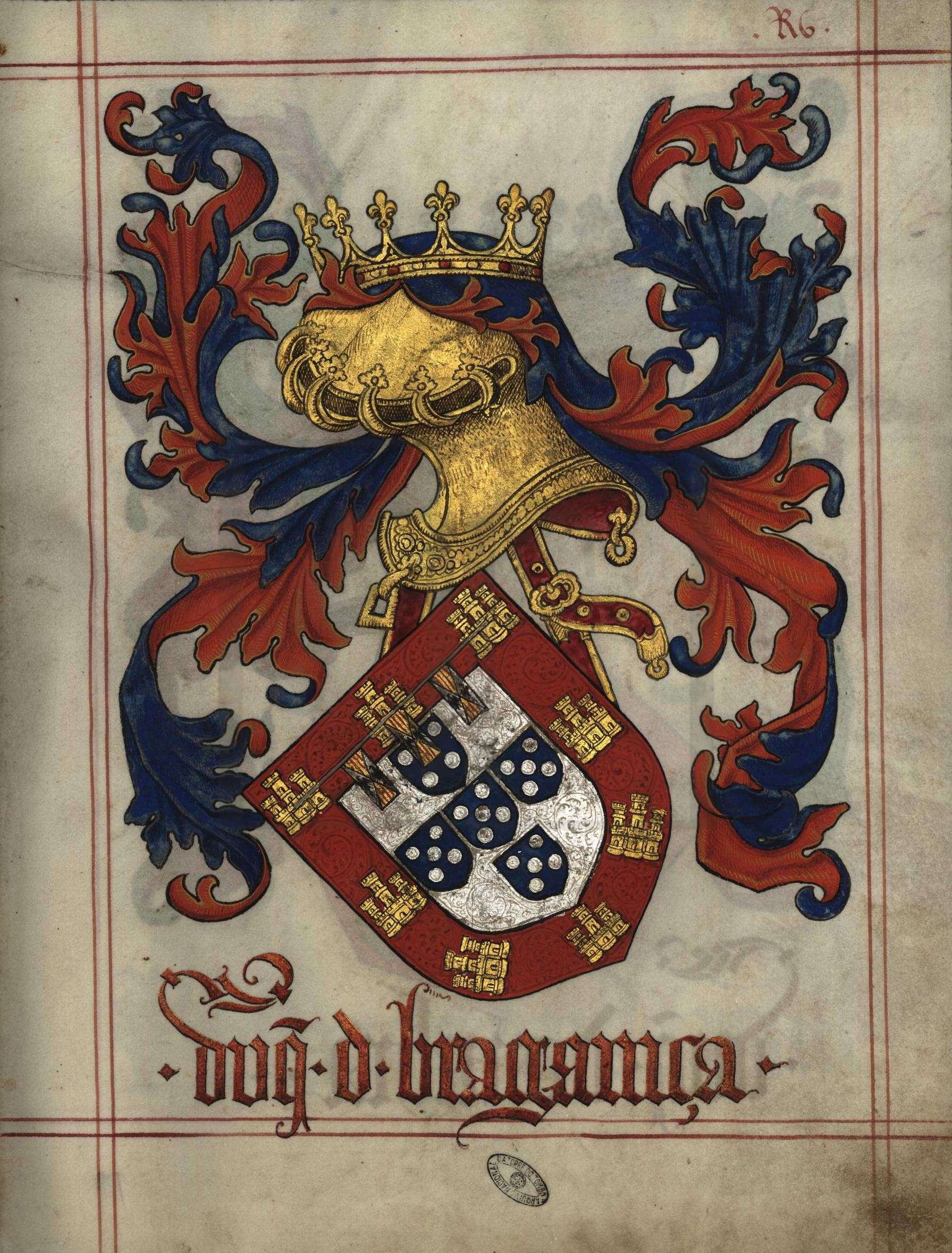
Arms of the Duke of Braganza (fl 45^{r})

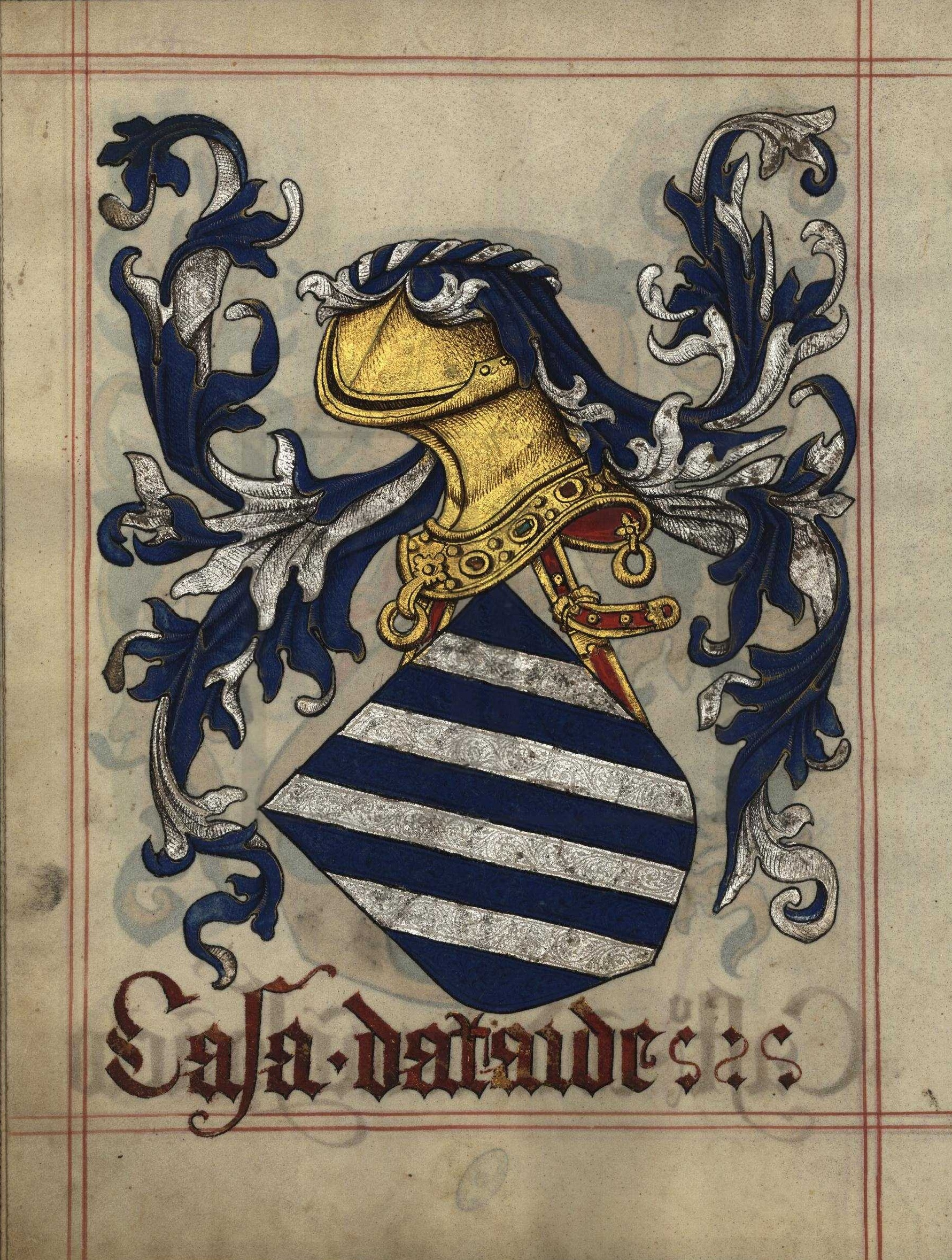
Arms of Ataíde chefe (fl 49^{v})

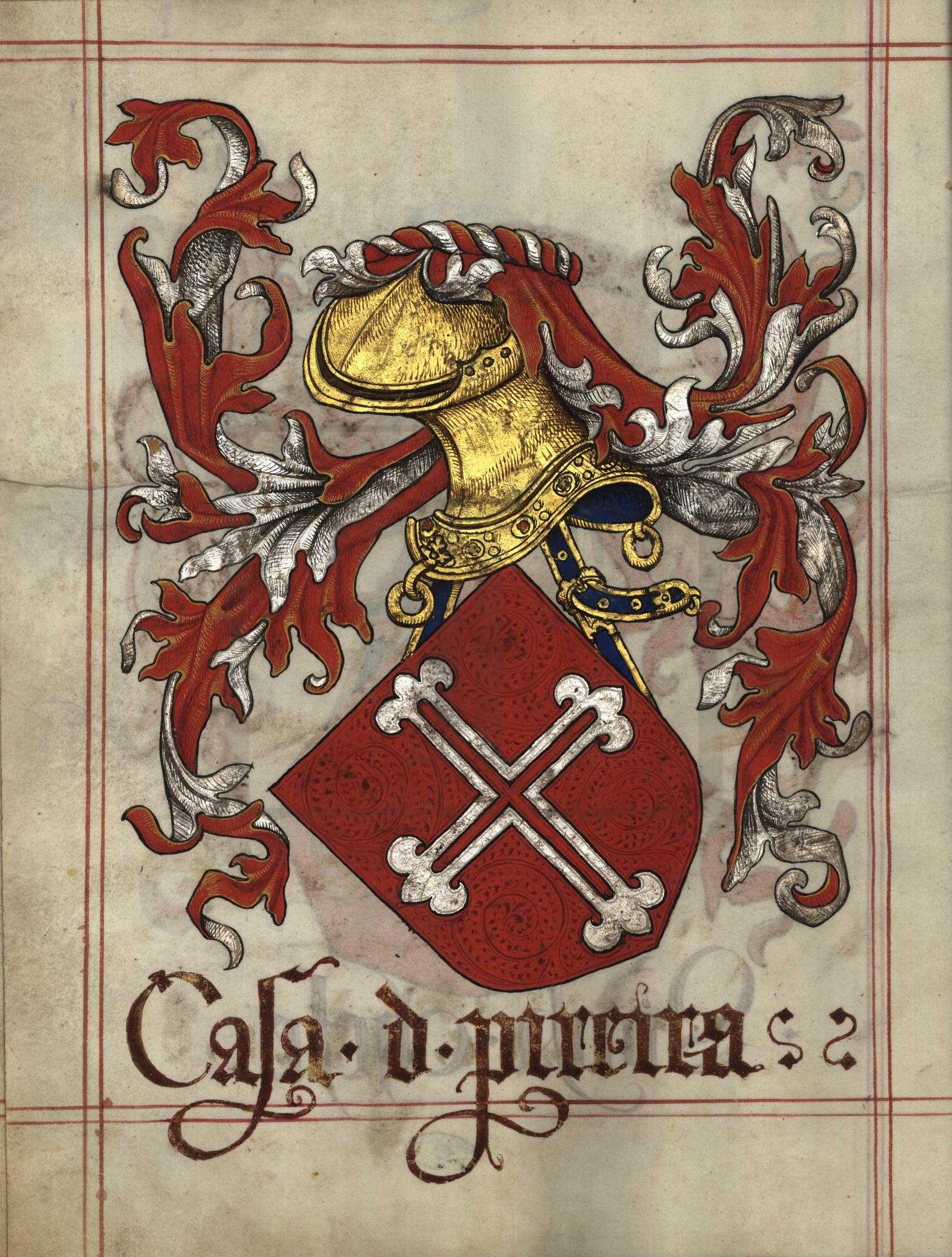
Arms of Pereira chefe (fl 52^{v})

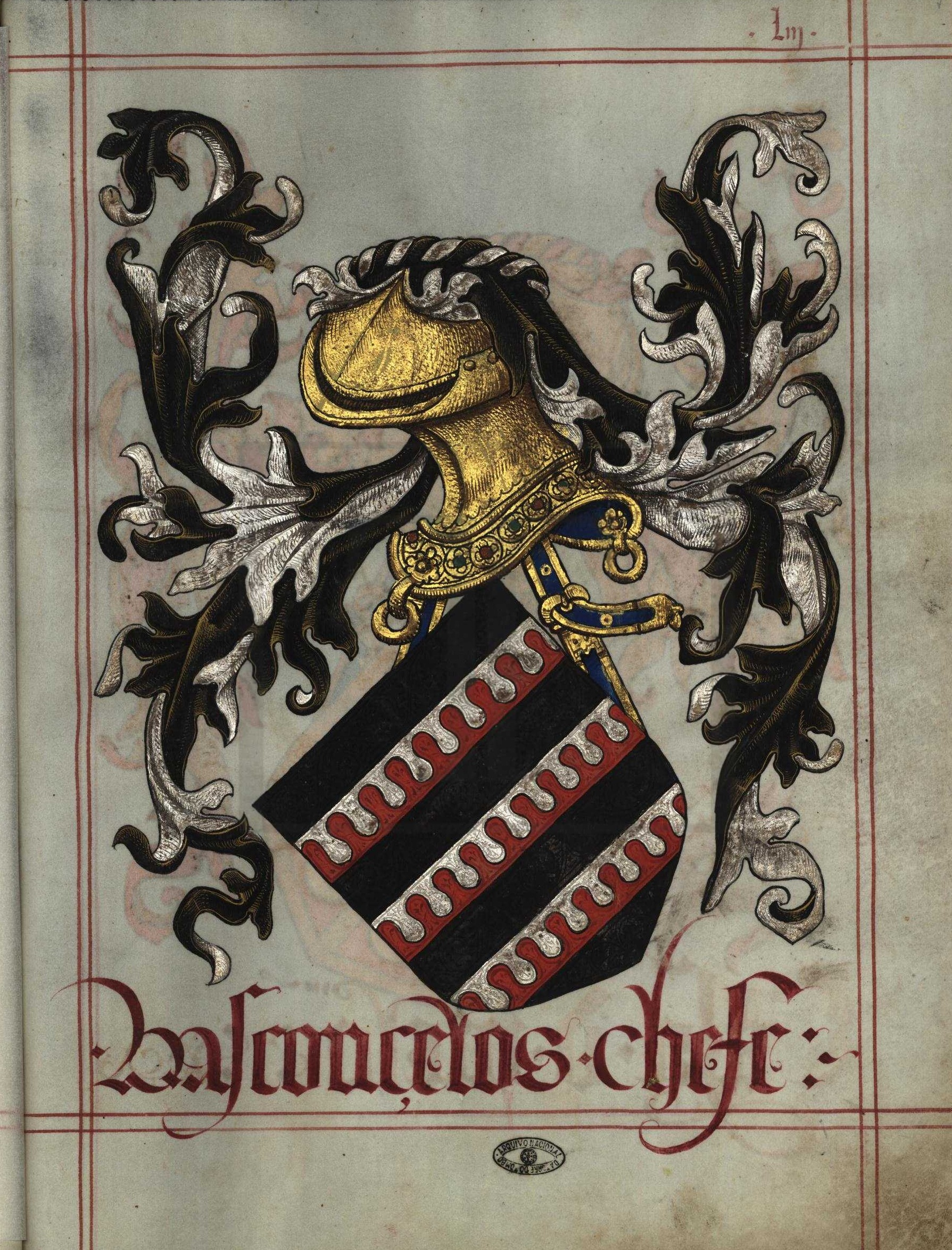
Arms of Vasconcelos chefe (fl 53^{r})

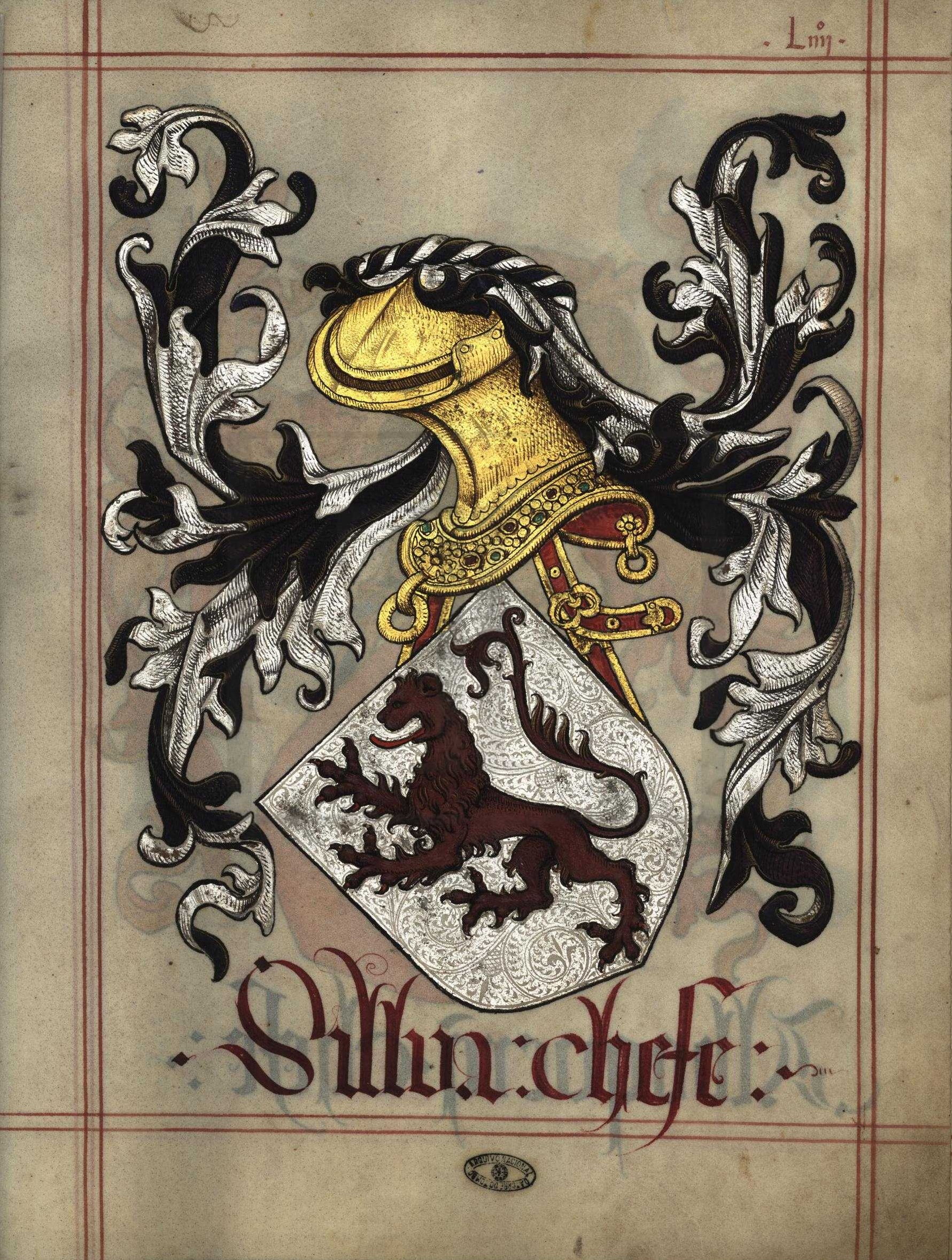
Arms of Silva chefe (fl 54^{r})

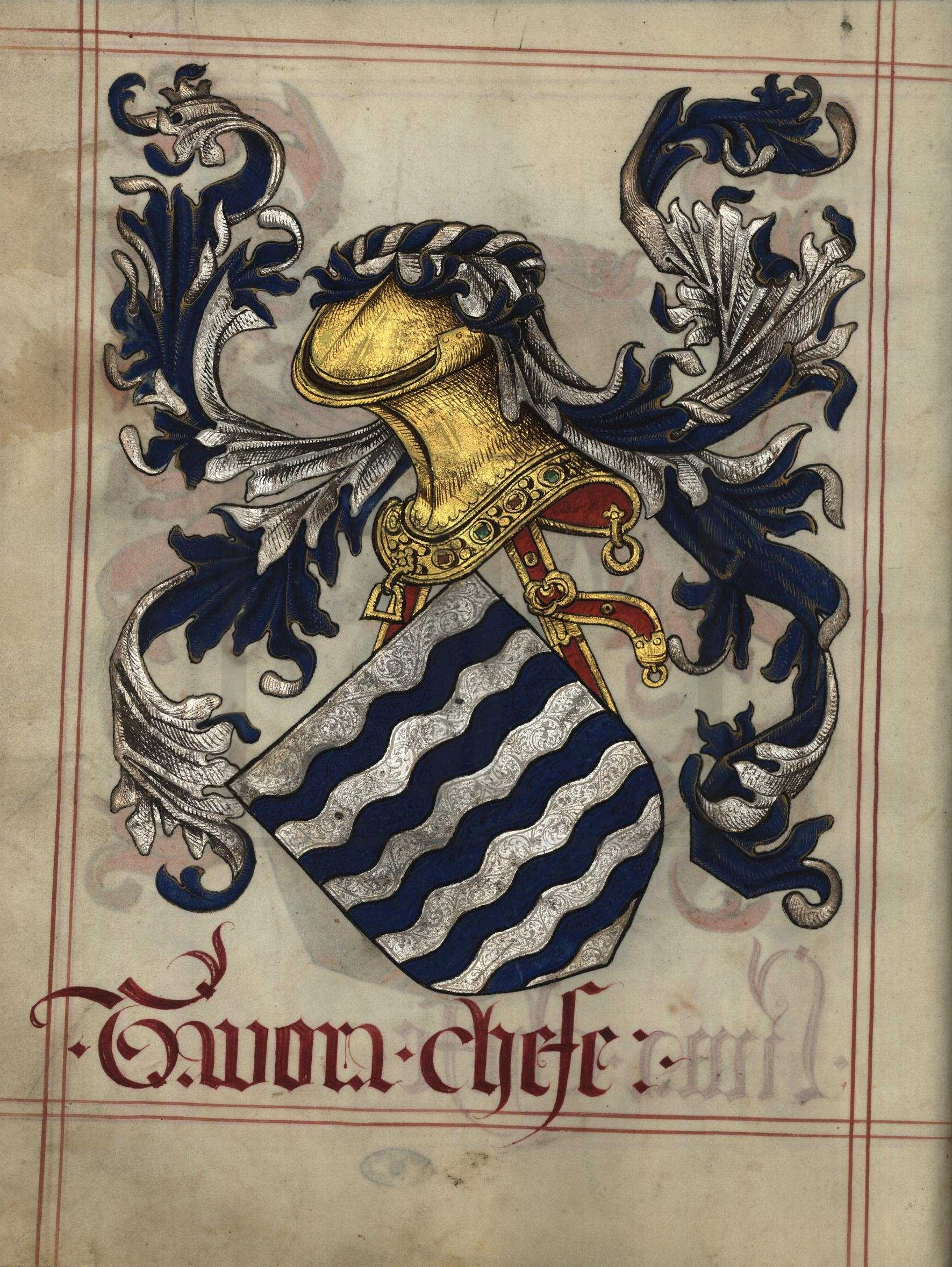
Arms of Távora chefe (fl 58^{r})

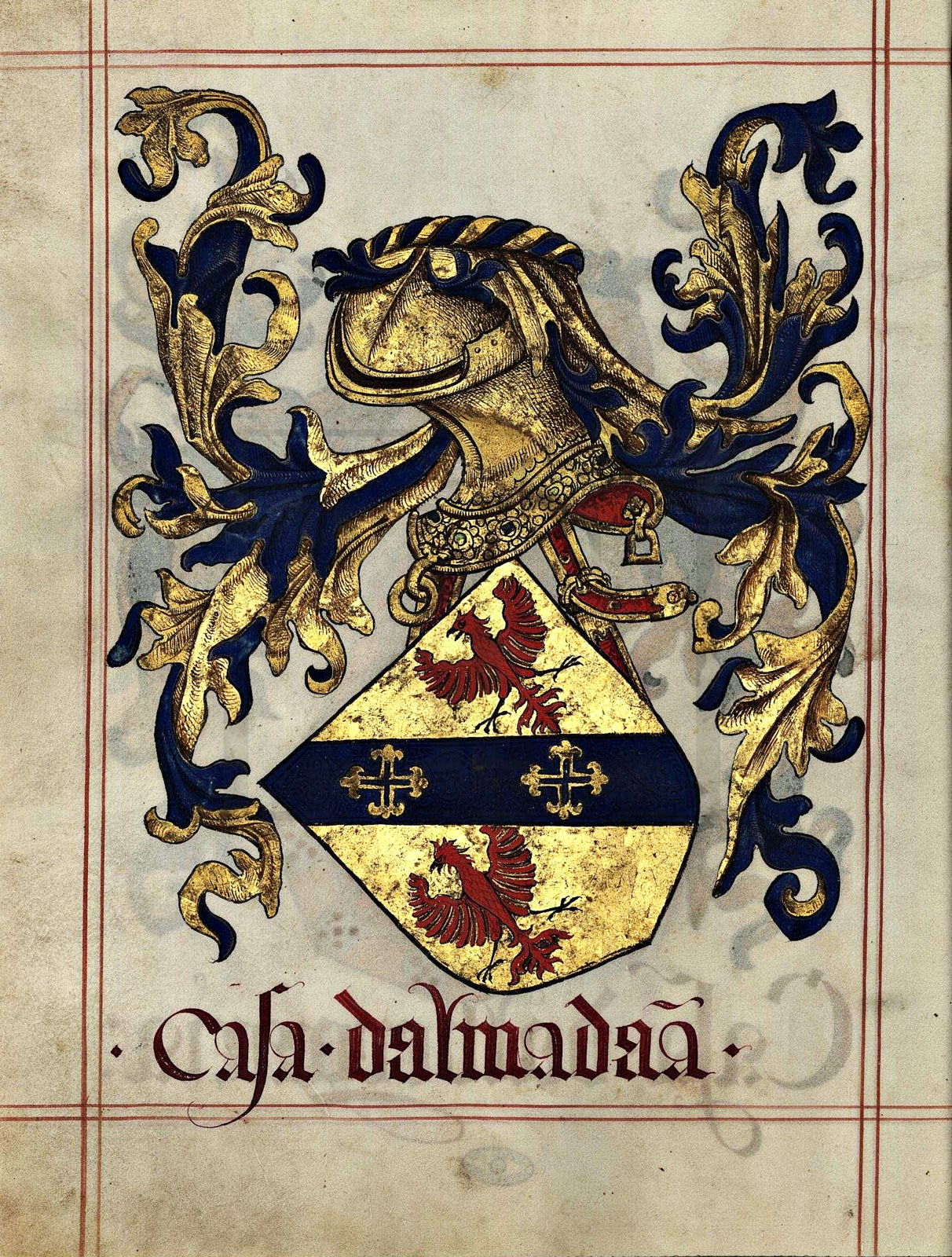
Arms of Almada chefe (fl 60)

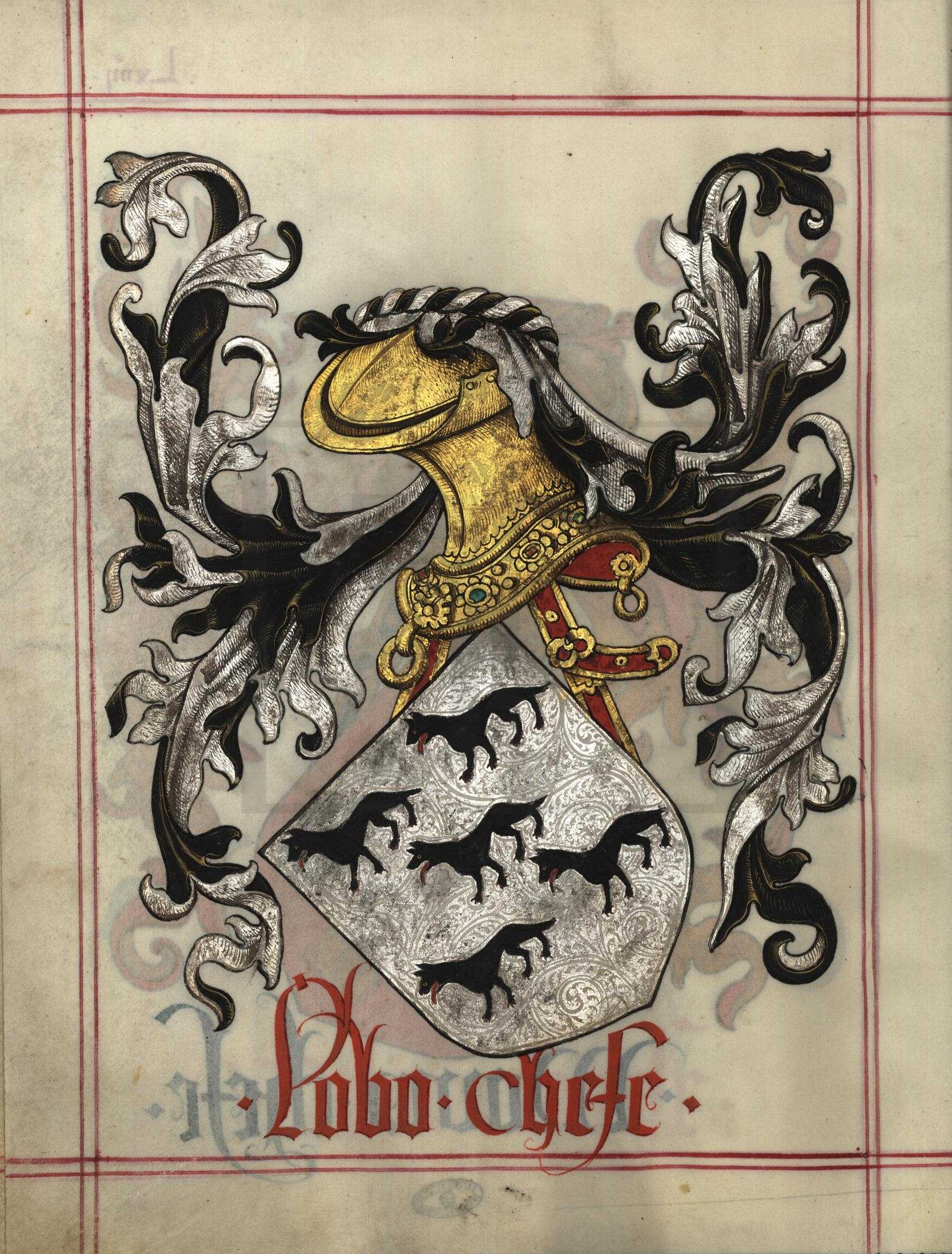
Arms of Lobo chefe (fl 64^{v})

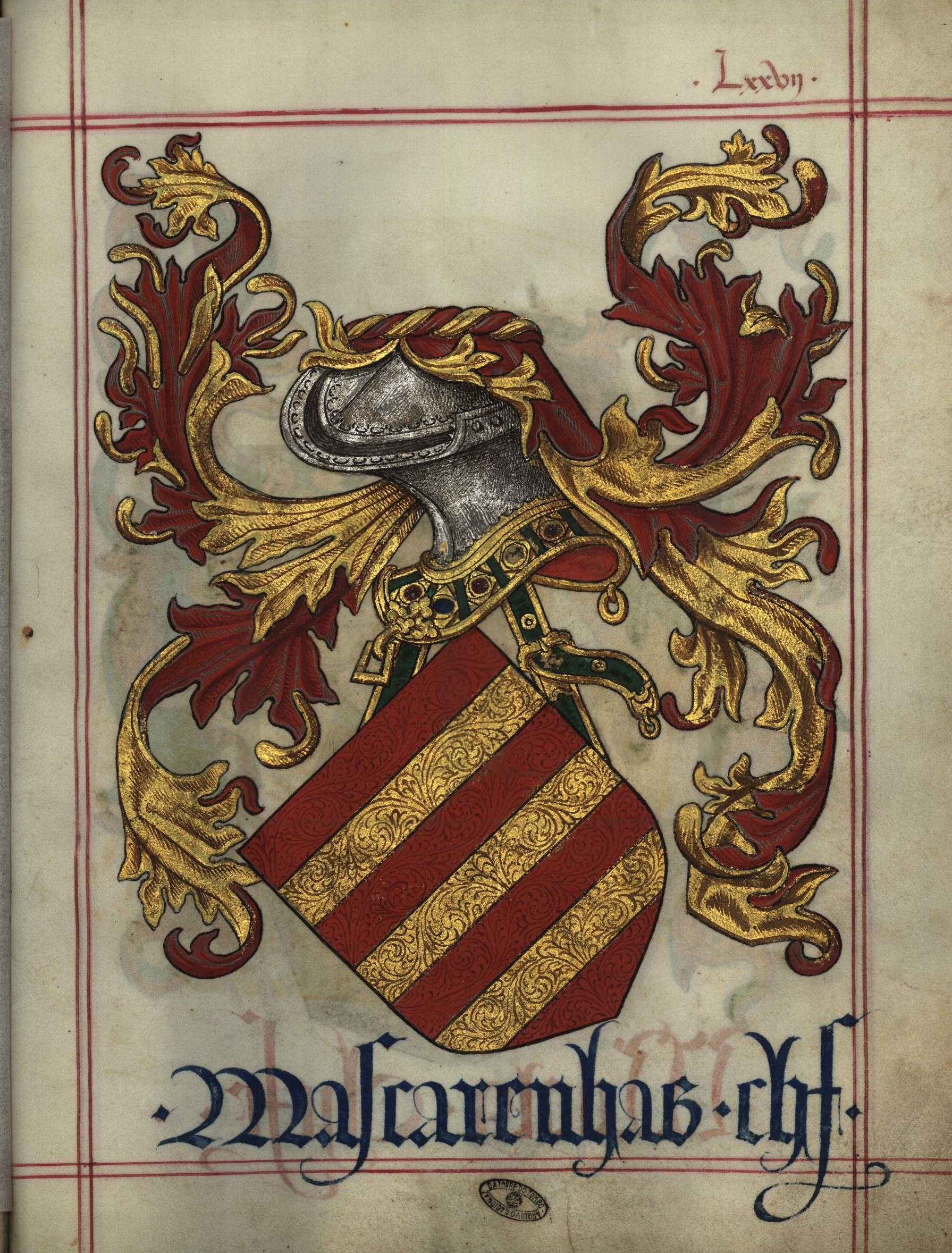
Arms of Mascarenhas chefe (fl 77^{v})

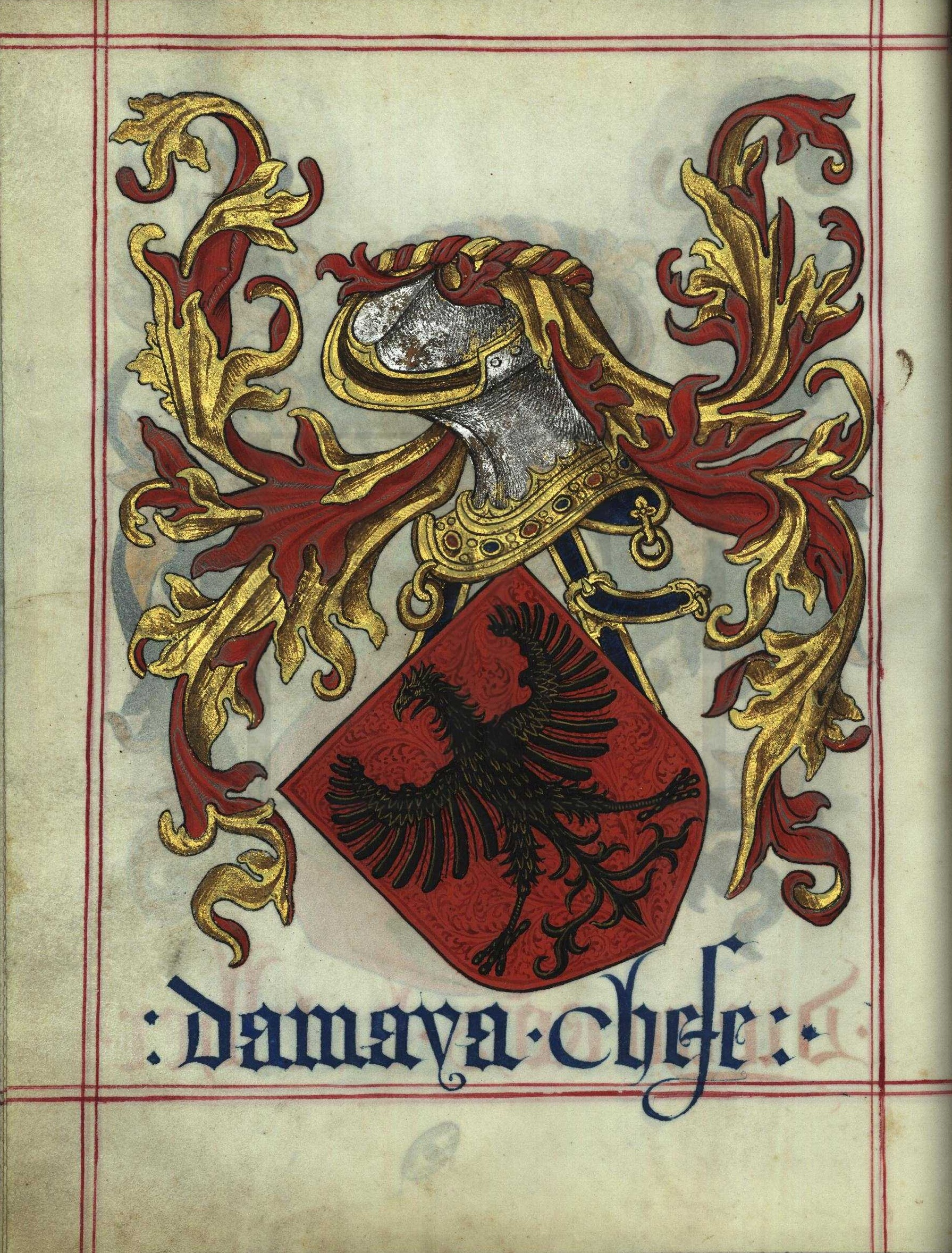
Arms of Maia chefe (fl 100^{v})

- King D. João and his Queen (fl 42^{r})
- King D. Manuel and his Queen (fl 42^{v})
- Queen D. Leonor (fl 43^{r})
- Queen D. Maria (fl 43^{v})
- King of Portugal (fl 44^{r})
- Prince of Portugal (fl 44^{v})
- Duke of Braganza (fl 45^{r})
- Duke of Coimbra (fl 45^{v})
- Marquis of Vila Real (fl 46^{r})
- House of Braganza (fl 46^{v})
- Count of Penela (Vasconcelos e Meneses, 1471) (fl 47^{r})
- Noronha (Count of Odemira, 1446) (fl 47^{v})
- Count of Valença (Meneses, 1464) (fl 48^{r})
- Count of Marialva (Coutinho, 1440) (fl 48^{v})
- Castro Count of Monsanto (1460) (fl 49^{r})
- Ataíde (Count of Atouguia, 1448) (fl 49^{v})
- Eça (fl 50^{r})
- Meneses (Count of Cantanhede, 1479) (fl 50^{v})
- Castro (de treze arruelas) (fl 51^{r})
- Cunha (fl 51^{v})
- Sousa (fl 52^{r})
- Pereira (Count of Feira, 1481) (fl 52^{v})
- Vasconcelos (fl 53^{r})
- Melo (Count of Tentúgal, 1504) (fl 53^{v})
- Silva (Count of Portalegre, 1498) (fl 54^{r})
- Albuquerque (fl 54^{v})
- Freire de Andrade (fl 55^{r})
- Almeida (Count of Abrantes, 1476) (fl 55^{v})
- D. Diogo de Almeida, prior of Crato (fl 56^{r})
- D. Pedro da Silva (fl 56^{v})
- Manuel (fl 57^{r})
- Moniz de Lusignan (fl 57^{v})
- Lima (fl 58^{r})
- Távora (fl 58^{v})
- Henriques (fl 59^{r})
- Mendonça (fl 59^{v})
- Albergaria (fl 60^{r})
- Almada (fl 60^{v})
- Azevedo (fl 61^{r})
- Castelo-Branco (fl 61^{v})
- Baião Resende (fl 62^{r})
- Abreu (fl 62^{v})
- Brito (fl 63^{r})
- Moniz (fl 63^{v})
- Moura (fl 64^{r})
- Lobo (Baron of Alvito (Lobo da Silveira), 1475) (fl 64^{v})
- Sá (fl 65^{r})
- Lemos (fl 65^{v})
- Ribeiro (fl 66^{r})
- Cabral (fl 66^{v})
- Cerveira (fl 67^{r})
- Miranda (fl 67^{v})
- Silveira (fl 68^{r})
- Falcão (fl 68^{v})
- Góios (fl 69^{r})
- Góis (fl 69^{v})
- Sampaio (fl 70^{r})
- Malafaia (fl 70^{v})
- Tavares (fl 71^{r})
- Pimentel (fl 71^{v})
- Sequeira (fl 72^{r})
- Costa (fl 72^{v})
- Lago (fl 73^{r})
- Vasco Anes Corte-Real (fl 73^{v})
- Meira (fl 74^{r})
- Boim (fl 74^{v})
- Passanha (fl 75^{r})
- Teixeira (fl 75^{v})
- Pedrosa (fl 76^{r})
- Bairros (fl 76^{v})
- Mascarenhas (fl 77^{r})
- Mota (fl 77^{v})
- Vieira (fl 78^{r})
- Bethancourt (fl 78^{v})
- Aguiar (fl 79^{r})
- Faria (fl 79^{v})
- Borges (fl 80^{r})
- Pacheco (fl 80^{v})
- Souto Maior (fl 81^{r})
- Serpa (fl 81^{v})
- Barreto (fl 82^{r})
- Arca (fl 82^{v})
- Nogueira (fl 83^{r})
- Pintos (fl 83^{v})
- Coelho (fl 84^{r})
- Queirós (fl 84^{v})
- Sem (fl 85^{r})
- Aguilar (fl 85^{v})
- Duarte Brandão (fl 86^{r})
- Gama (fl 86^{v})
- D. Vasco da Gama, Admiral of India (fl 87^{r})
- Fonseca (fl 87^{v})
- Ferreira (fl 88^{r})
- Magalhães (fl 88^{v})
- Fogaça (fl 89^{r})
- Valente (fl 89^{v})
- Boto (fl 90^{r})
- Lobato (fl 90^{v})
- Gorizo (fl 91^{r})
- Caldeira (fl 91^{v})
- Tinoco (fl 92^{r})
- Barbudo (fl 92^{v})
- Barbuda (fl 93^{r})
- Beja (fl 93^{v})
- Valadares (fl 94^{r})
- Larzedo (fl 94^{v})
- Galvão (fl 95^{r})
- Nóbrega (fl 95^{v})
- Barboso (fl 96^{r})
- Godinho (fl 96^{v})
- Barbato (fl 97^{r})
- Aranha (fl 97^{v})
- Gouveia (fl 98^{r})
- Francisco de Beja (fl 98^{v})
- Jácome (fl 99^{r})
- Vogado (fl 99^{v})
- Diogo Roiz Botilher (fl 100^{r})
- Maia (fl 100^{v})
- Serrão (fl 101^{r})
- Pedroso (fl 101^{v})
- Mexias (fl 102^{r})
- Grã (fl 102^{v})
- Pestana (fl 103^{r})
- Vilalobos (fl 103^{v})
- Pêro da Alcáçova (fl 104^{r})
- Abul (fl 104^{v})
- Gabriel Gonçalves (Temudo)(fl 105^{r})
- Gilvant Vistet(fl 105^{v})
- Afonso Garcês (fl 106^{r})
- Rolão d'Aussi (fl 106^{v})
- Velxira (fl 107^{r})
- Pina (fl 107^{v})
- Pêro Lourenço de Guimarães (fl 108^{r})
- Matos (fl 108^{v})
- Ornelas (fl 109^{r})
- Cerqueira (fl 109^{v})
- Martim Leme (fl 110^{r})
- António Leme (fl 110^{v})
- Vilhegas (fl 111^{r})
- D. Pêro Rodrigues (Amaral) (fl 111^{v})
- Figueira de Chaves (fl 112^{r})
- Veiga (fl 112^{v})
- Pau (fl 113^{r})
- Taveira (fl 113^{v})
- Ortiz (fl 114^{r})
- Azinhal Sacoto (fl 114^{v})
- Paim (fl 115^{r})
- Porras (fl 115^{v})
- Viveiro (fl 116^{r})
- João Lopes de Leão (fl 116^{v})

=== Other Houses and Nobles ===
From folio 117 onwards, the work presents four coats of arms per page. These are essentially Houses of lesser category and more recent nobility. Among the 72 coats of arms in the Hall of Sintra, only a few are found in this section: those of the Carvalhos. These were not, in 1509, great manorial Houses; they were lineages whose sons held minor positions at the court throughout the 14th and 15th centuries, as in the case of the Azambujas, Cogominhos, Portocarreiros, etc. Other coats of arms are personal and directly related to the Age of Discoveries, such as those of Fernão Gomes da Mina, Diogo Cão, Nicolau Coelho, etc. The coats of arms in this section do not have paquife or virol.

The antepenultimate coats of arms occupy the upper left corner of the page, which is otherwise blank. The last two, each occupying a full page, display virol, paquife, and timbre, but they are later than the execution of the Livro do Armeiro-Mor.

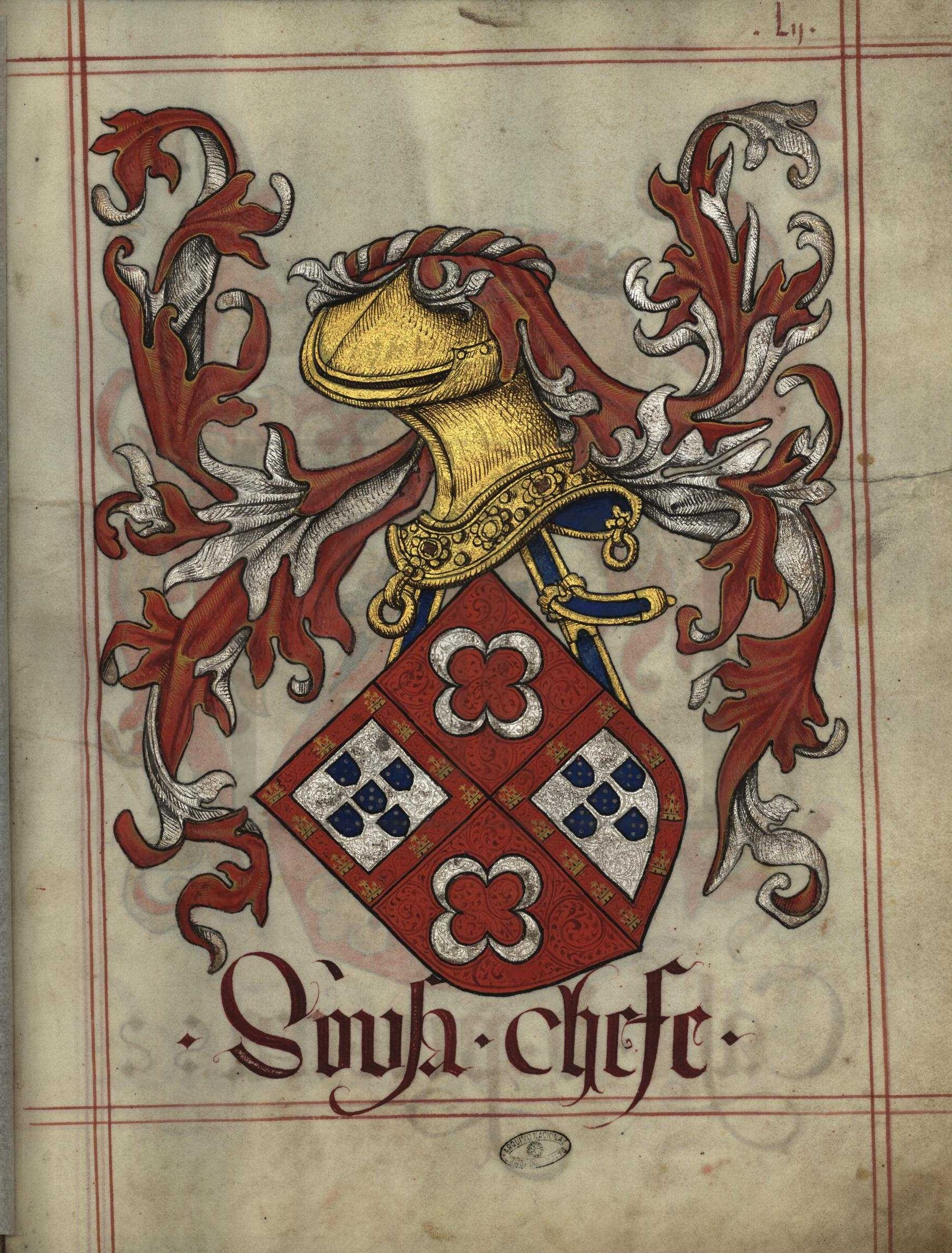
Coat of arms of Sousa chief (fl 52^{r})

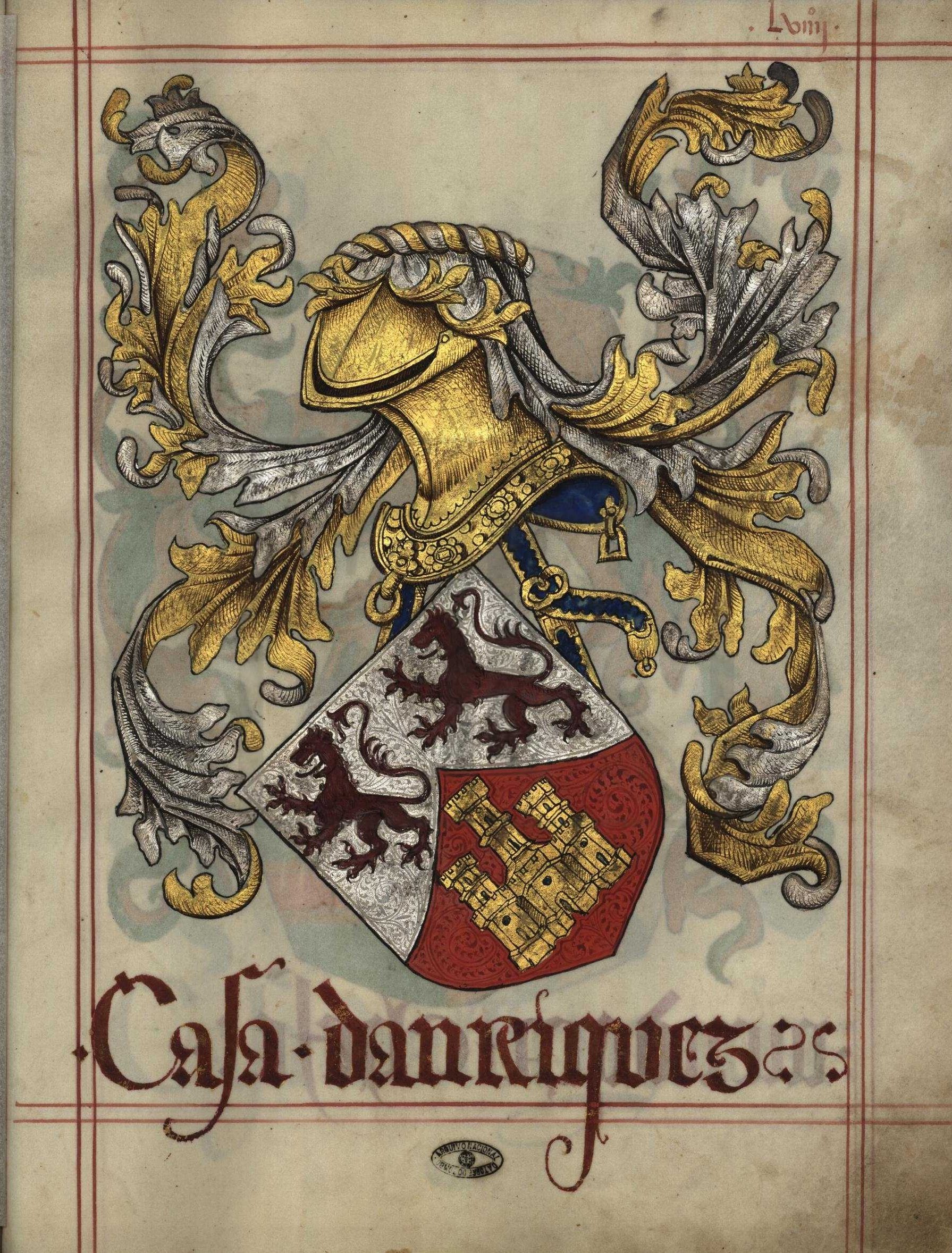
Coat of arms of Henriques chief (fl 59^{r})

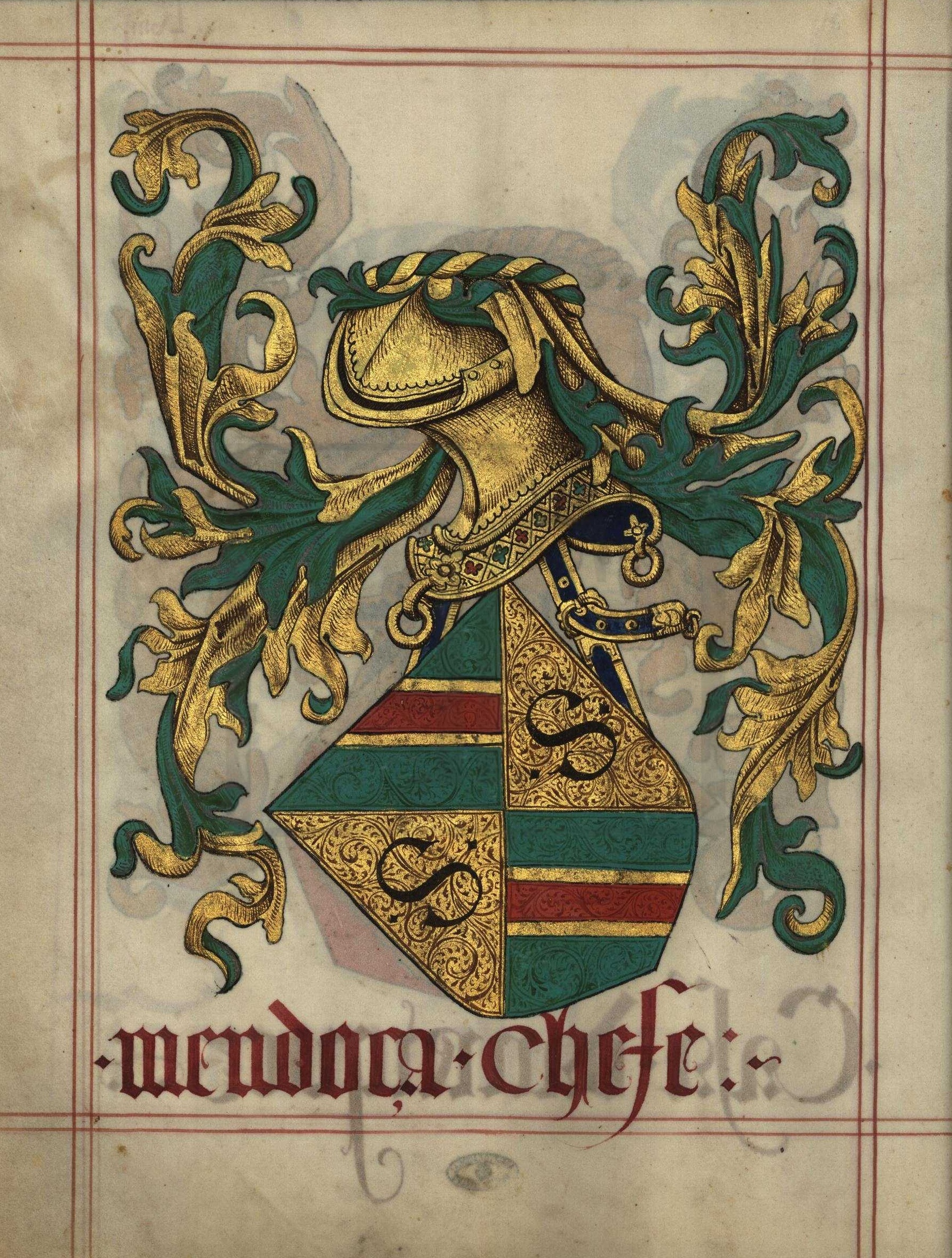
Coat of arms of Mendoça chief (fl 59^{v})

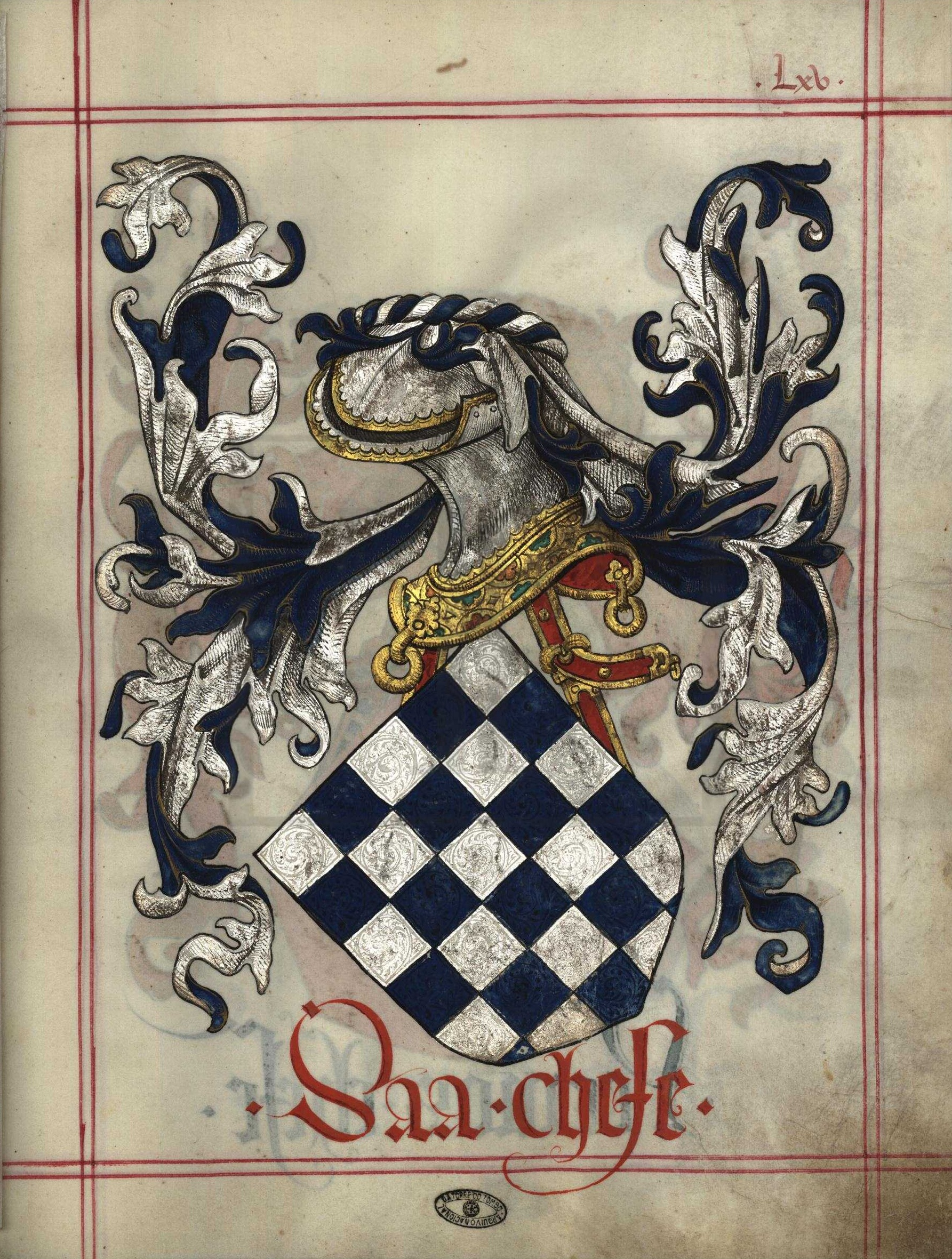
Coat of arms of Sá chief (fl 65^{r})

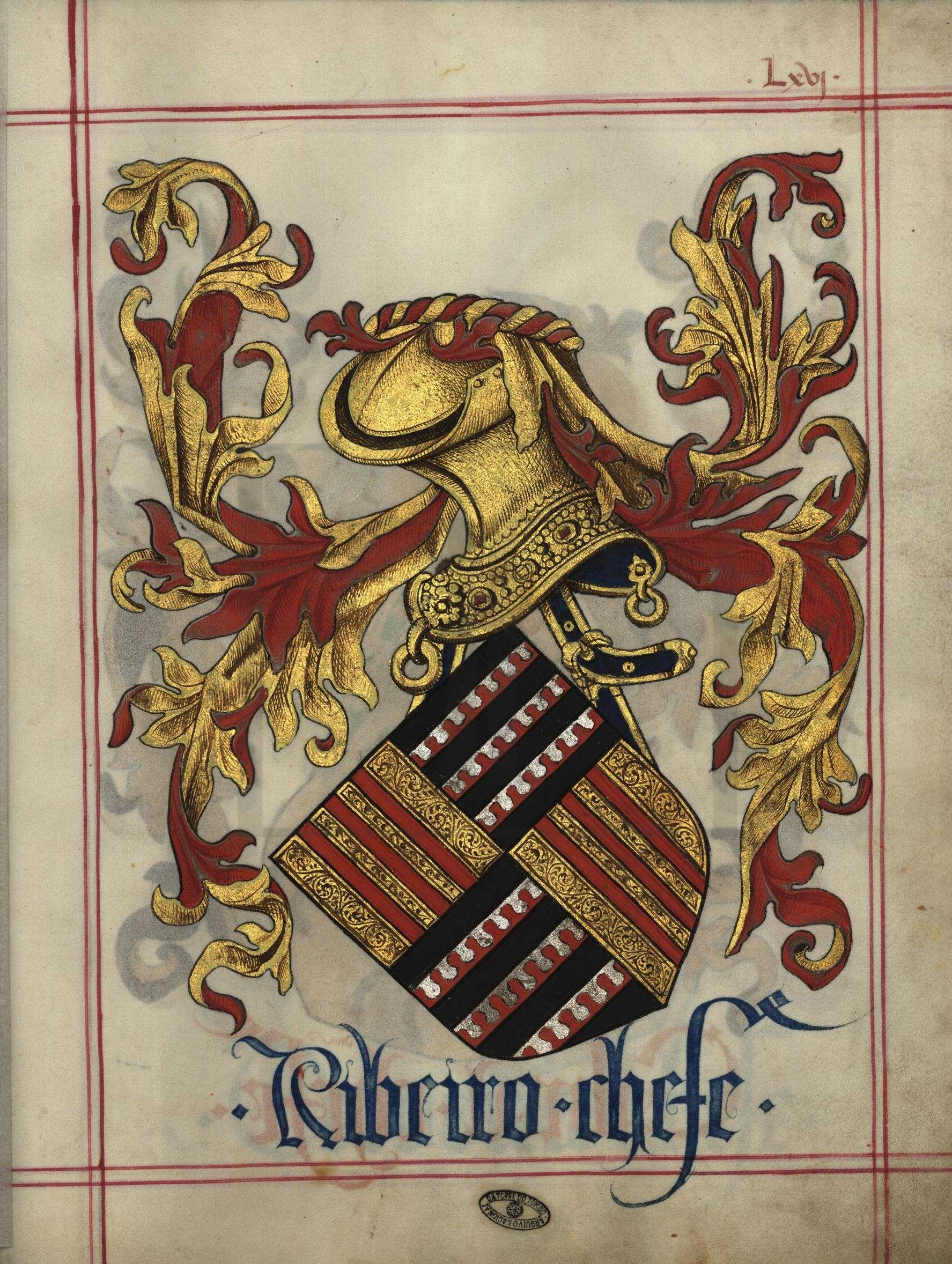
Coat of arms of Ribeiro chief (fl 66^{r})

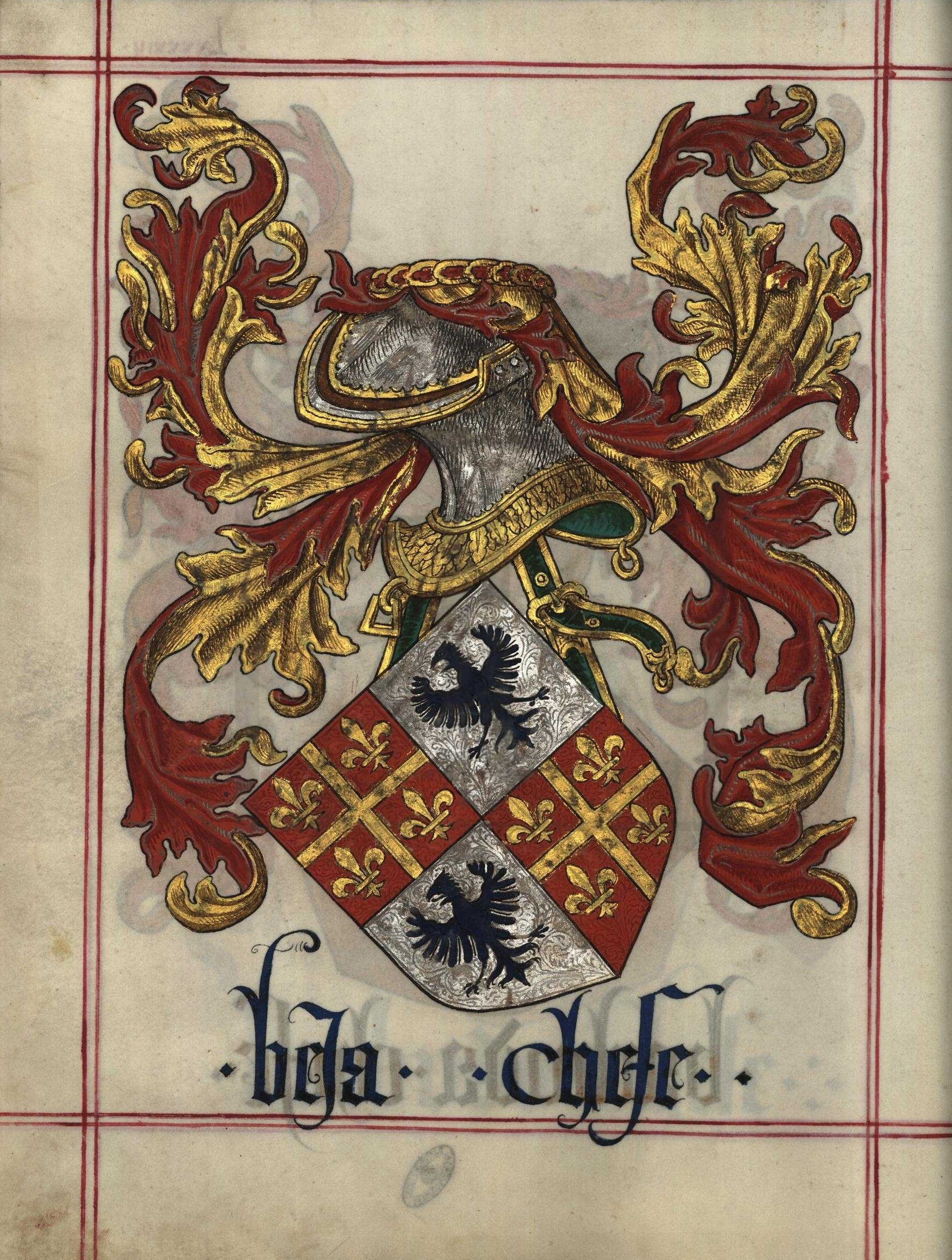
Coat of arms of Beja chief (fl 93^{v})

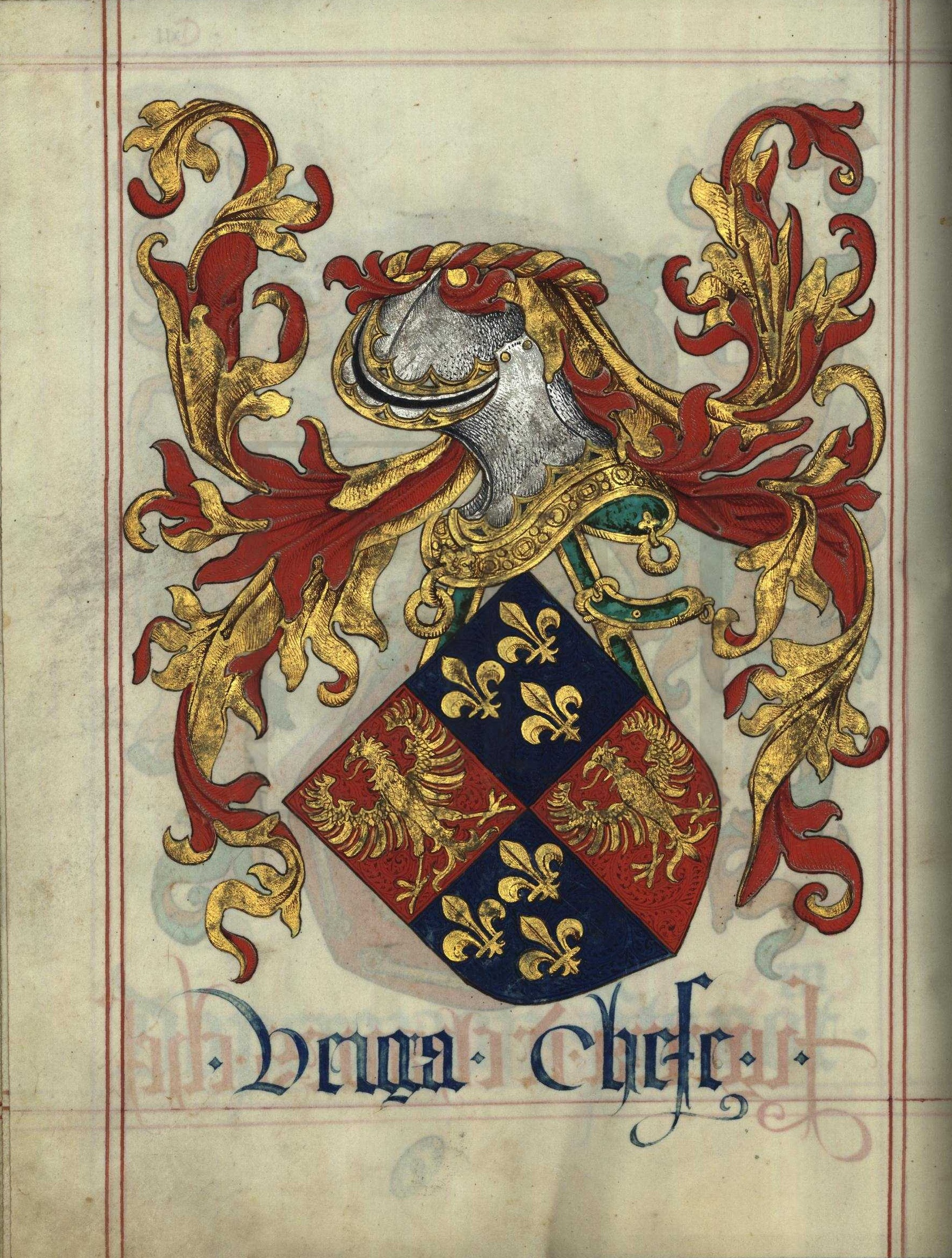
Coat of arms of Veiga chief (fl 112^{v})

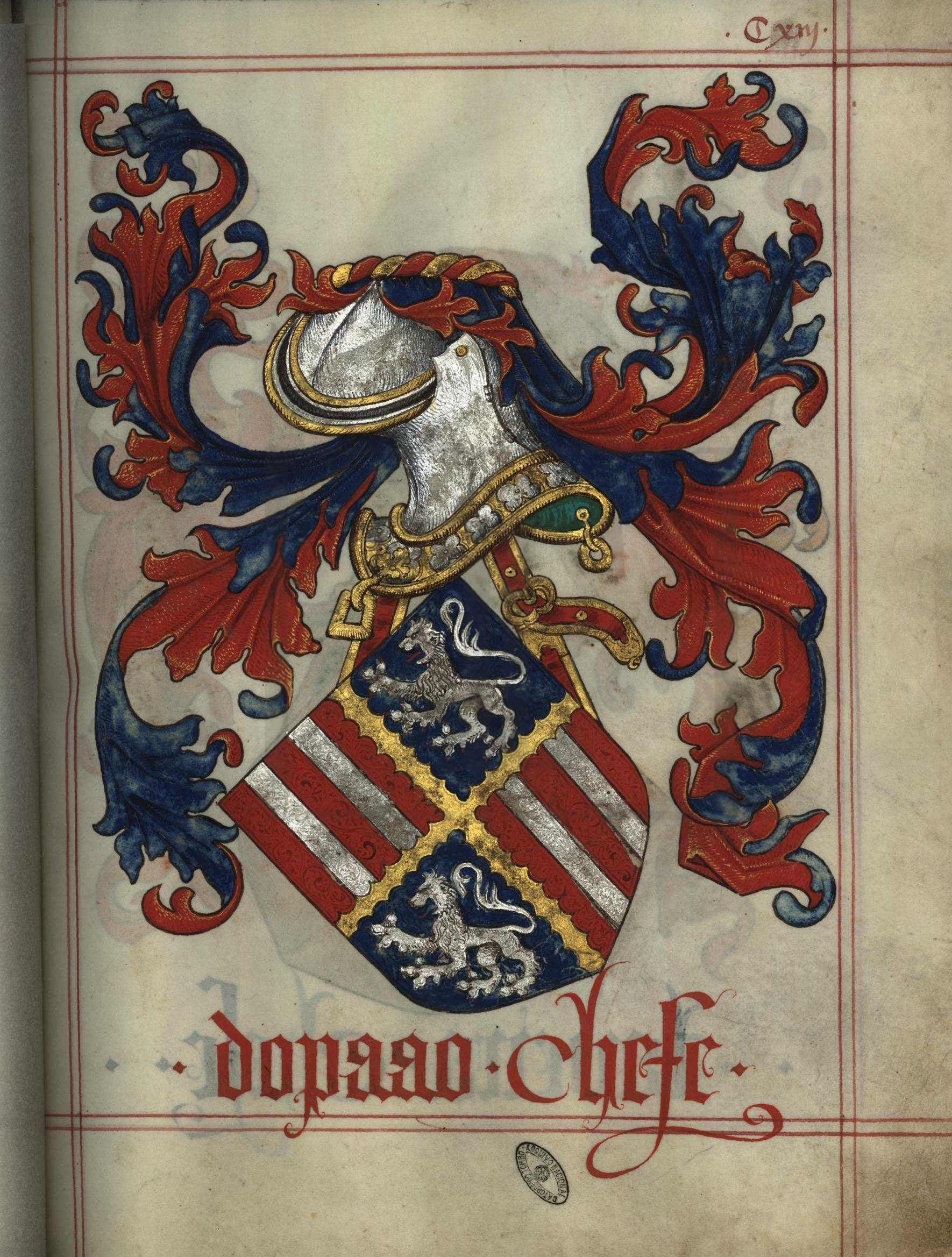
Coat of arms of Pau chief (fl 113^{r})

- Frazão (fl 117^{r}), upper left corner
- Teive (fl 117^{r}), upper right corner
- Alcoforado (fl 117^{r}), lower left corner
- Homem (fl 117^{r}), lower right corner
- Antas (fl 117^{v}), etc.
- Godim
- Barradas
- Leitão
- Barejola (fl 118^{r})
- João Álvares Colaço
- João Afonso de Santarém
- Fernão Gomes da Mina
- Vilanova (fl 118^{v})
- Barba
- Privado
- João da Fazenda
- Gomide (fl 119^{r})
- Chacim
- Taborda
- Paiva
- Filipe (fl 119^{v})
- Felgueira
- Amaral
- Casal
- Velho (fl 120^{r})
- Lordelo
- Peixoto
- Novais
- Carvoeiro (fl 120^{v})
- Gatacho
- Borreco (sic)
- Vale
- Barroso (fl 121^{r})
- Fafes
- Ulveira
- Carregueiro
- João Garcês (fl 121^{v})
- Gonçalo Pires Bandeira
- Calça
- Rebelo
- Portocarreiro (fl 122^{r})
- Azambuja
- Pais
- Metelo
- (Unnamed coats of arms) (fl 122^{v})
- Botelho
- Correia
- Barbedo
- Freitas (fl 123^{r})
- Carvalho
- Negro
- Pinheiro de Andrade
- Pinheiro (fl 123^{v})
- Campos
- Gil Uant Ouvistet
- Albernaz
- Cardoso (fl 124^{r})
- Perdigão
- Vinhal
- Alpoim
- Carvalhal (fl 124^{v})
- Búzio
- Magalhães
- Maracote
- Fróis (fl 125^{r})
- Lobeira
- Frielas
- Antão Gonçalves
- Fuseiro (fl 125^{v})
- Morais
- Unha
- Almas
- Martim Rodrigues (fl 126^{r})
- Refóios
- Barbança
- Moreira
- Nicolau Coelho (fl 126^{v})
- Teive
- Cordovil
- Boteto
- Alvelos (fl 127^{r})
- Avelar
- Chaves
- Beça
- Montarroio (fl 127^{v})
- Farinha
- Cotrim
- Figueiredo
- Oliveira (fl 128^{r)}
- Cogominho
- Carreiro
- Marinho
- Brandão (fl 128^{v})
- Carrilho
- Sodré
- Machado
- Sardinha (fl 129^{r})
- Diogo Fernandes (Correia)
- João Lopes
- André Rodrigues
- Jorge Afonso (fl 129^{v})
- Lobia
- Guedes
- Franca (sic)
- Gramaxo (fl 130^{r})
- Castanheda
- Trigueiros
- Barboso
- Revaldo (fl 130^{v})
- Outis
- Bulhão
- Azeredo
- Travaços (fl 131^{r})
- Lei
- Quintal
- Canto
- Lagarto (fl 131^{v})
- Picanço
- Feijó
- Esteves
- Correia (fl 132^{r})
- Rocha
- Rego
- Galhardo
- Drago (fl 132^{v})
- Corvacho
- Camelo
- Tourinho
- Diogo Cão (fl 133^{r})
- Lanções
- Araújo
- Monteiro
- Gavião (fl 133^{v})
- Carrilho
- Arrais
- Barros
- João Fernandes de Andrade (page 283)
- Fagundes (page 283)
- Caiado Gamboa (page 283)
- D. João, bishop of Tânger (Lobo) (page 283)
- Severim (fl 134^{v})
- Presno
- D. Frei Henrique, bishop of Ceuta (Coimbra)
- Luís Álvares de Aveiro
- Estêvão Martins, School Master (fl 135^{r})
- Ribafria (fl 136^{r})
- Torres (fl 137^{r})

== Gallery ==
=== Livro do Armeiro-Mor, National Archive of Torre do Tombo, Lisbon ===
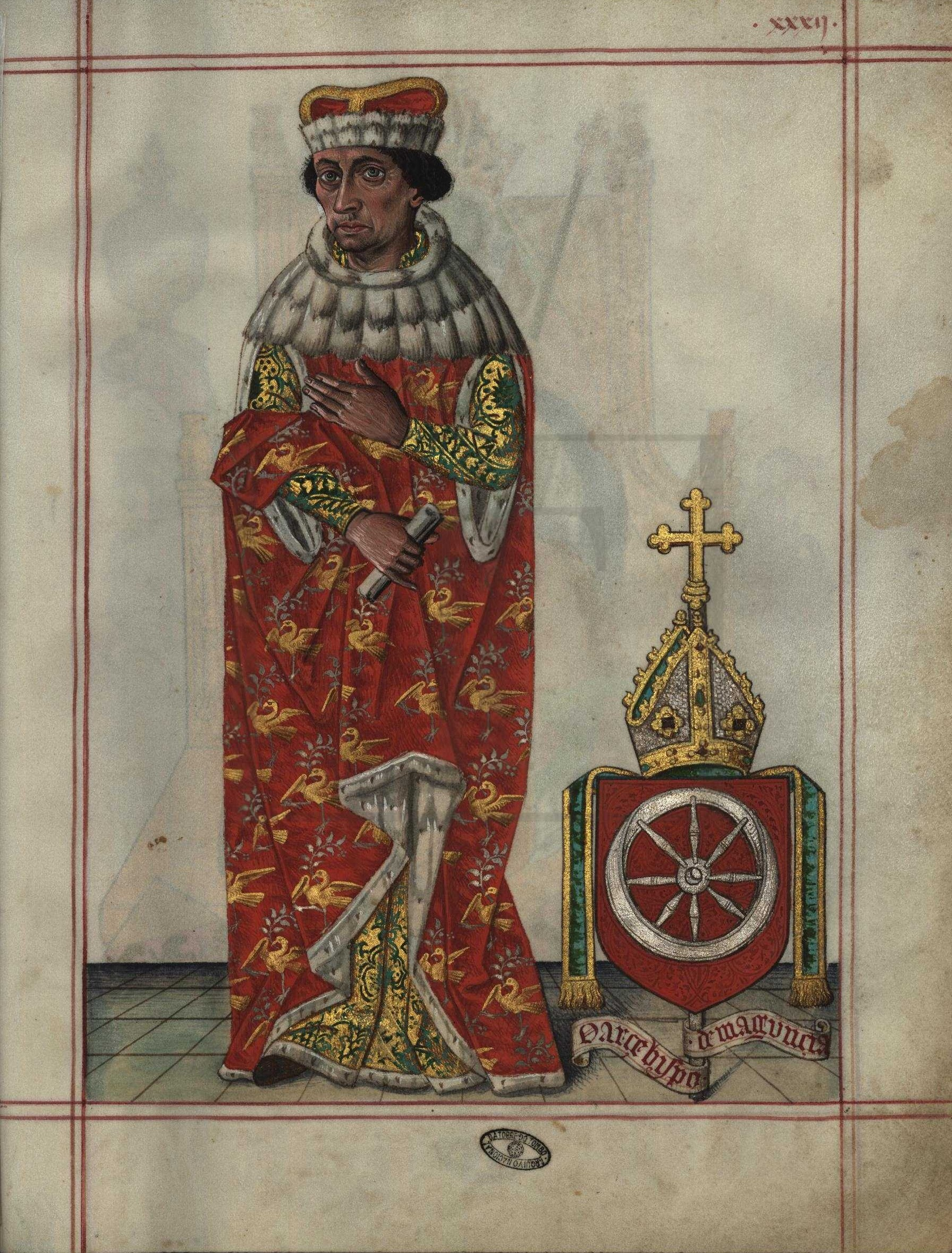
Coat of arms of the Archbishop of Mainz (fl 32^{r})

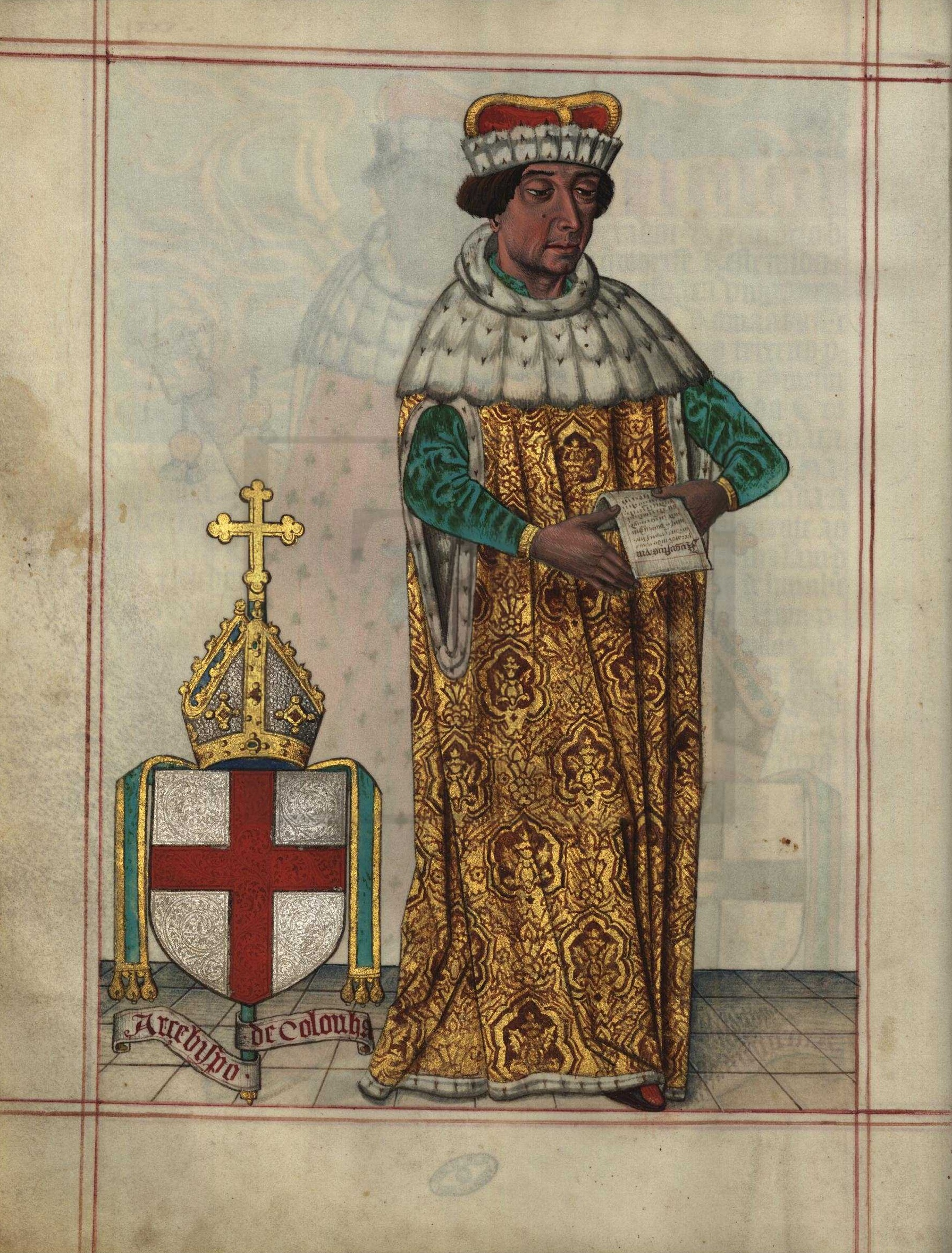
Coat of arms of the Archbishop of Cologne (fl 31^{v})

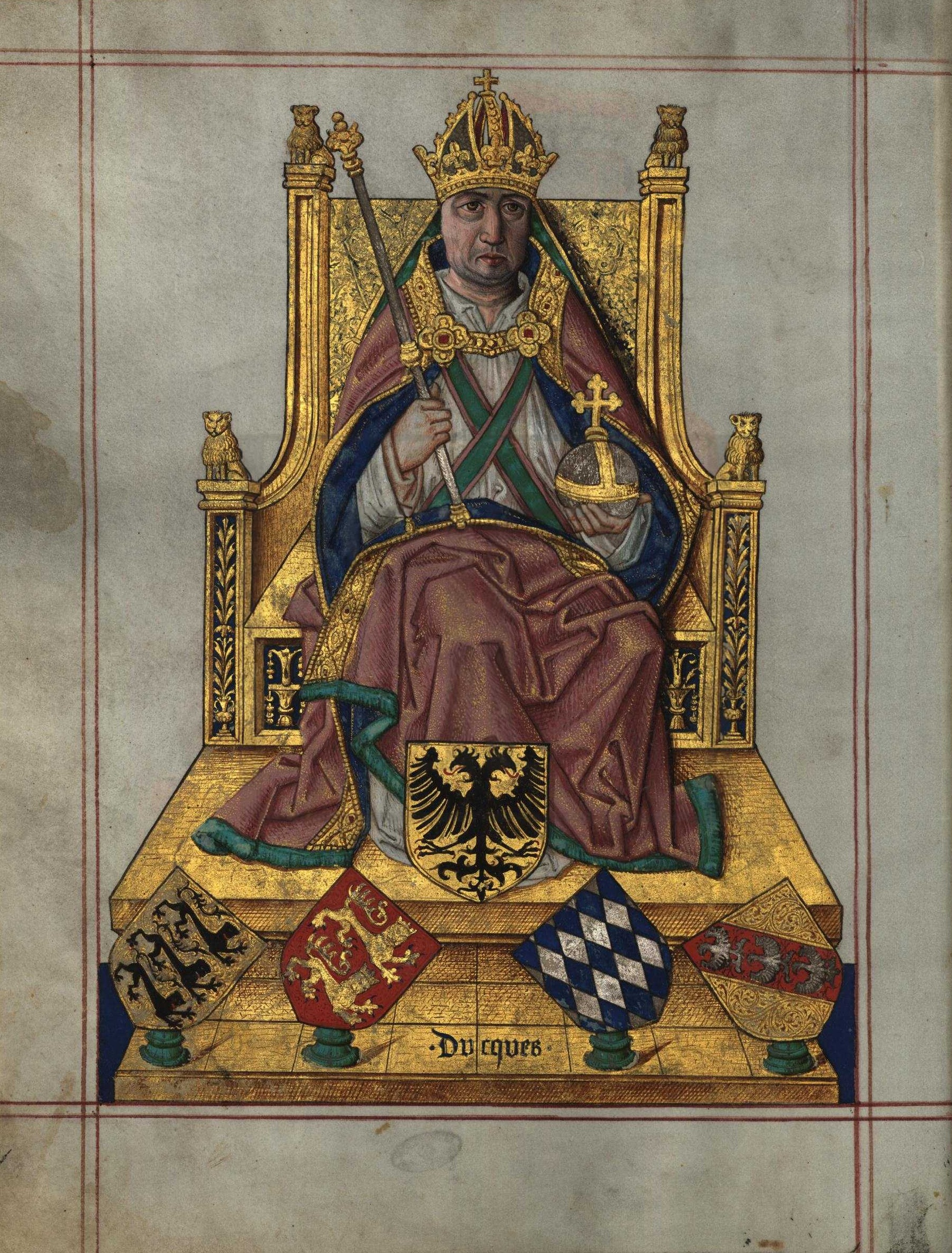
Election of the Emperor of Germany (fl 32^{v})

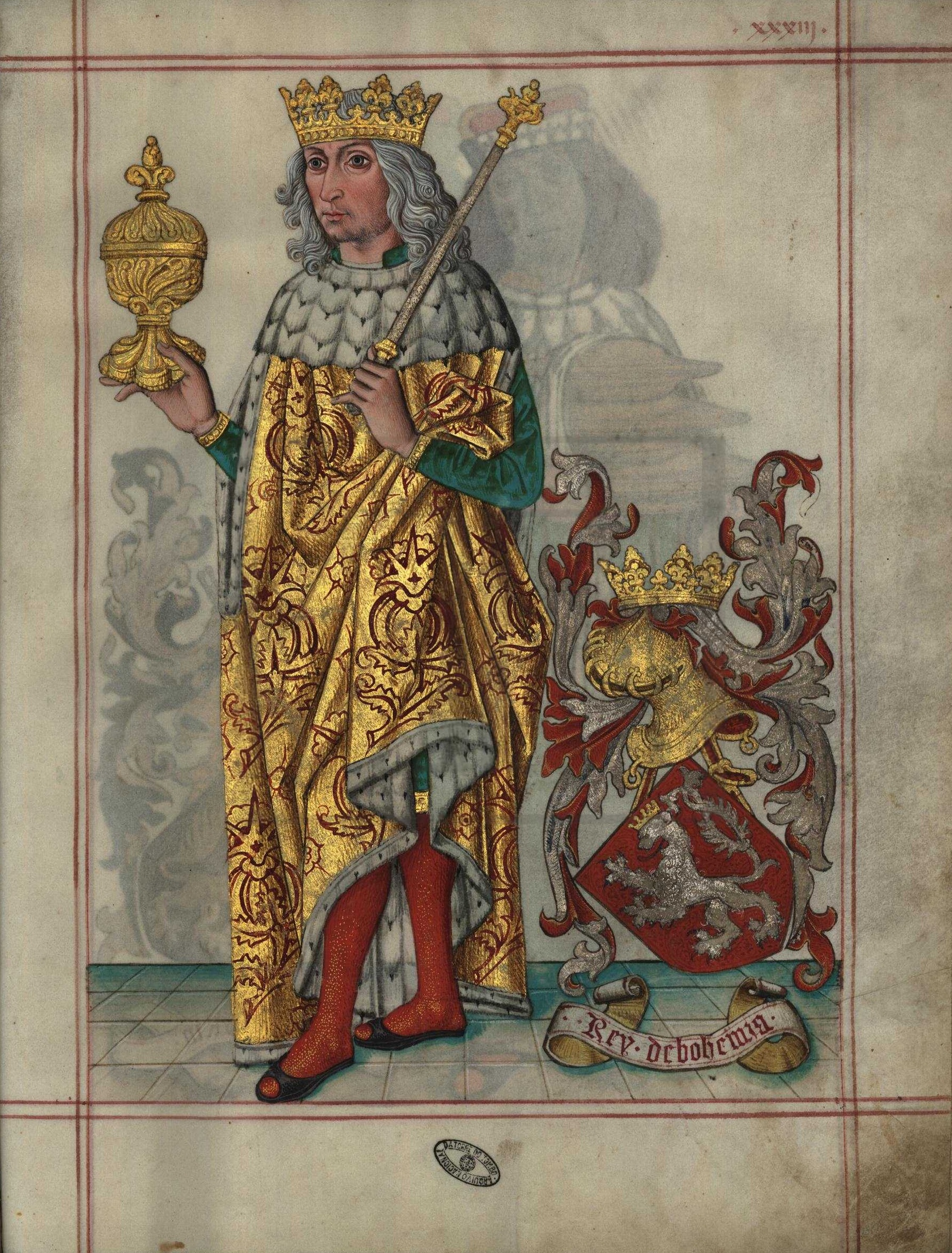
Coat of arms of the King of Bohemia (fl 33^{r})

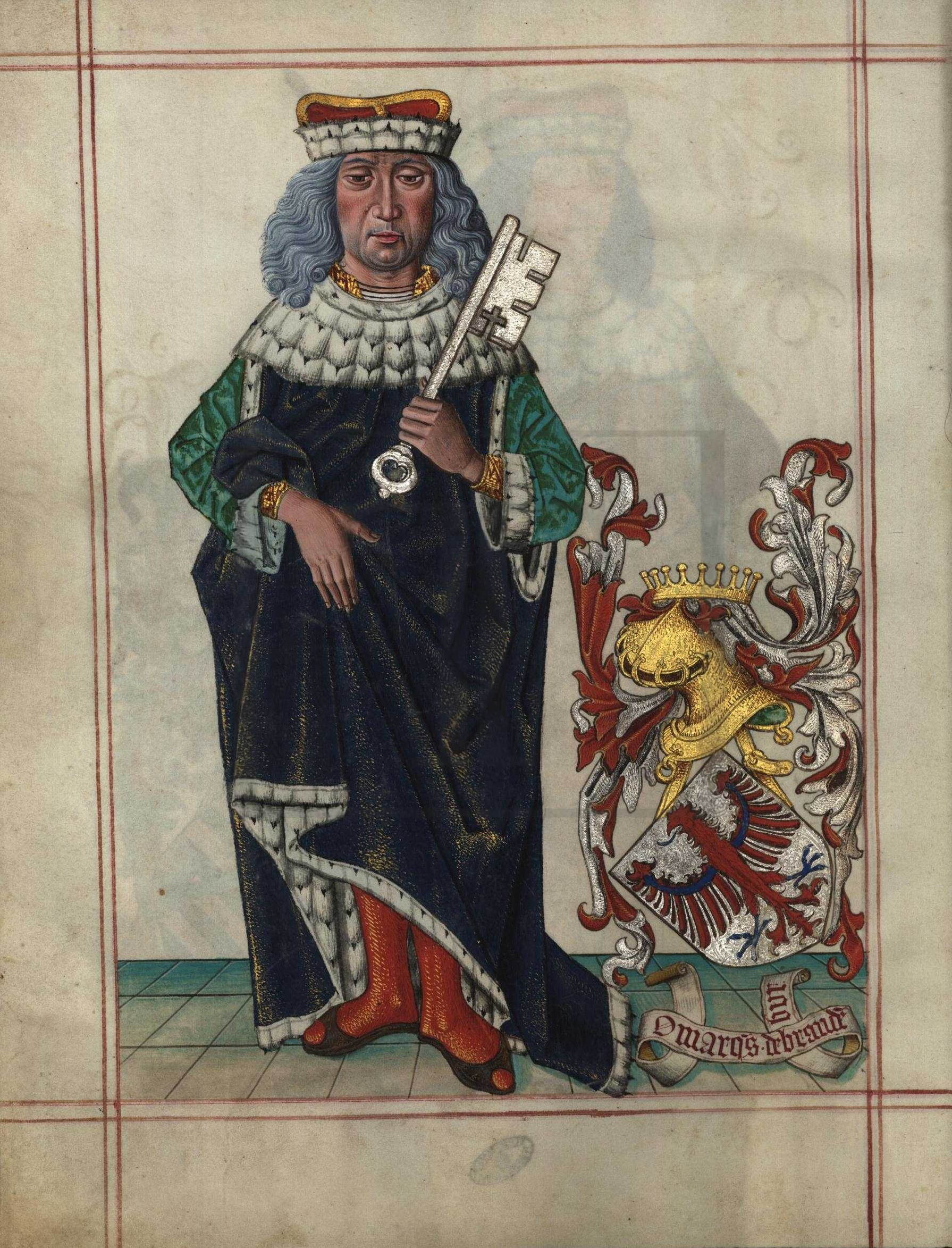
Coat of arms of the Margrave of Brandenburg (fl 34^{v})

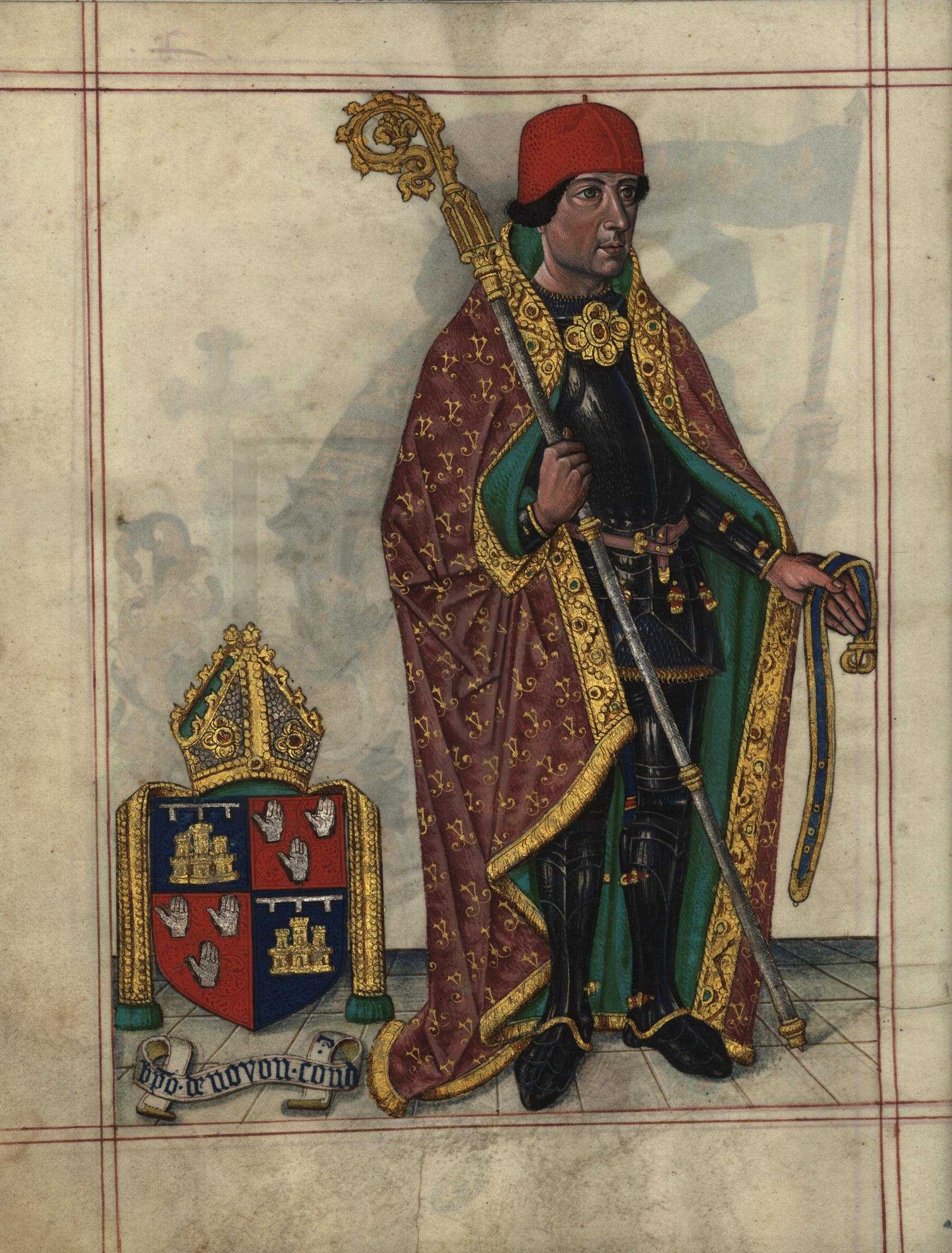
Coat of arms of the Bishop of Noyon (fl 40^{v})

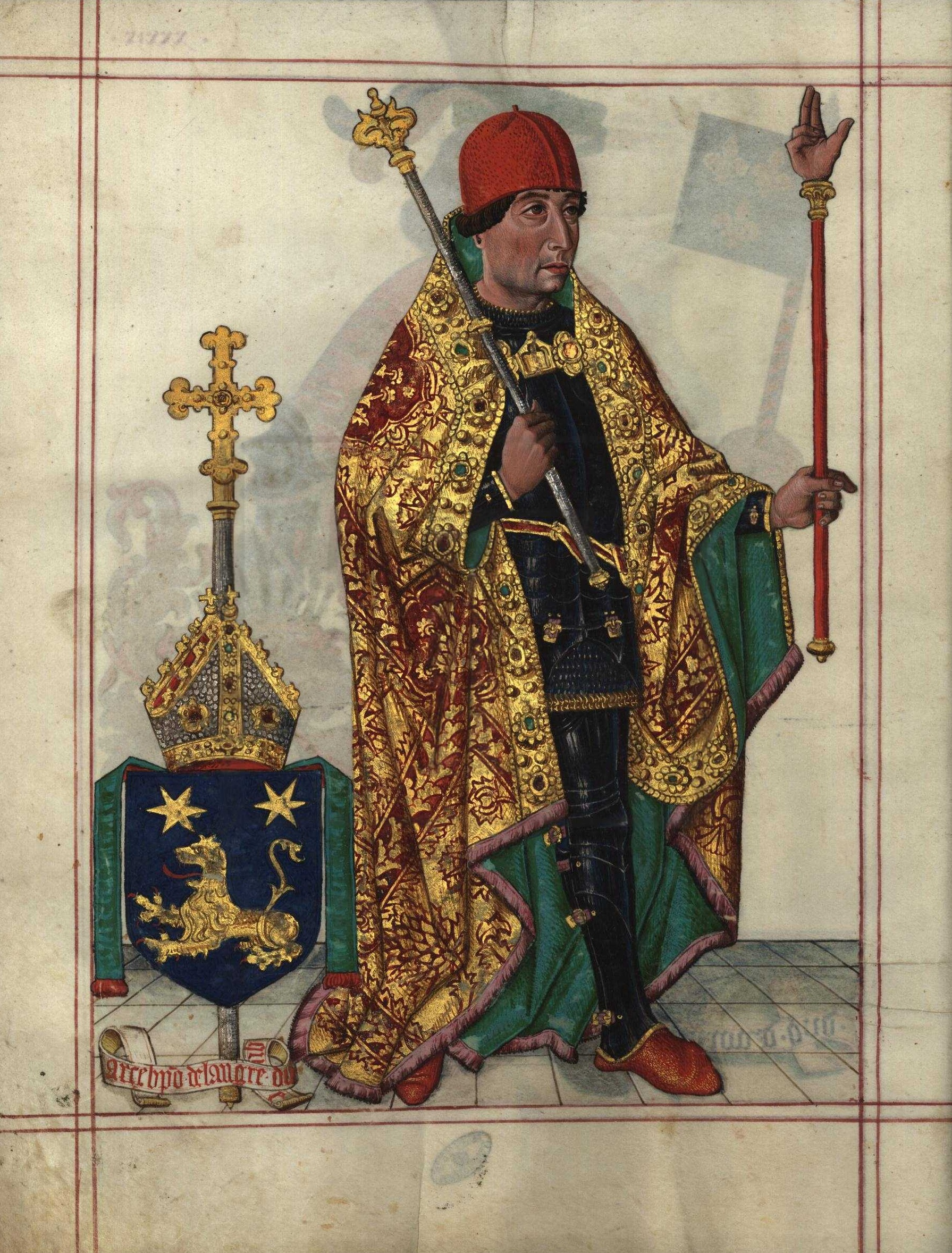
Coat of arms of the Archbishop of Langres (fl 39^{v})

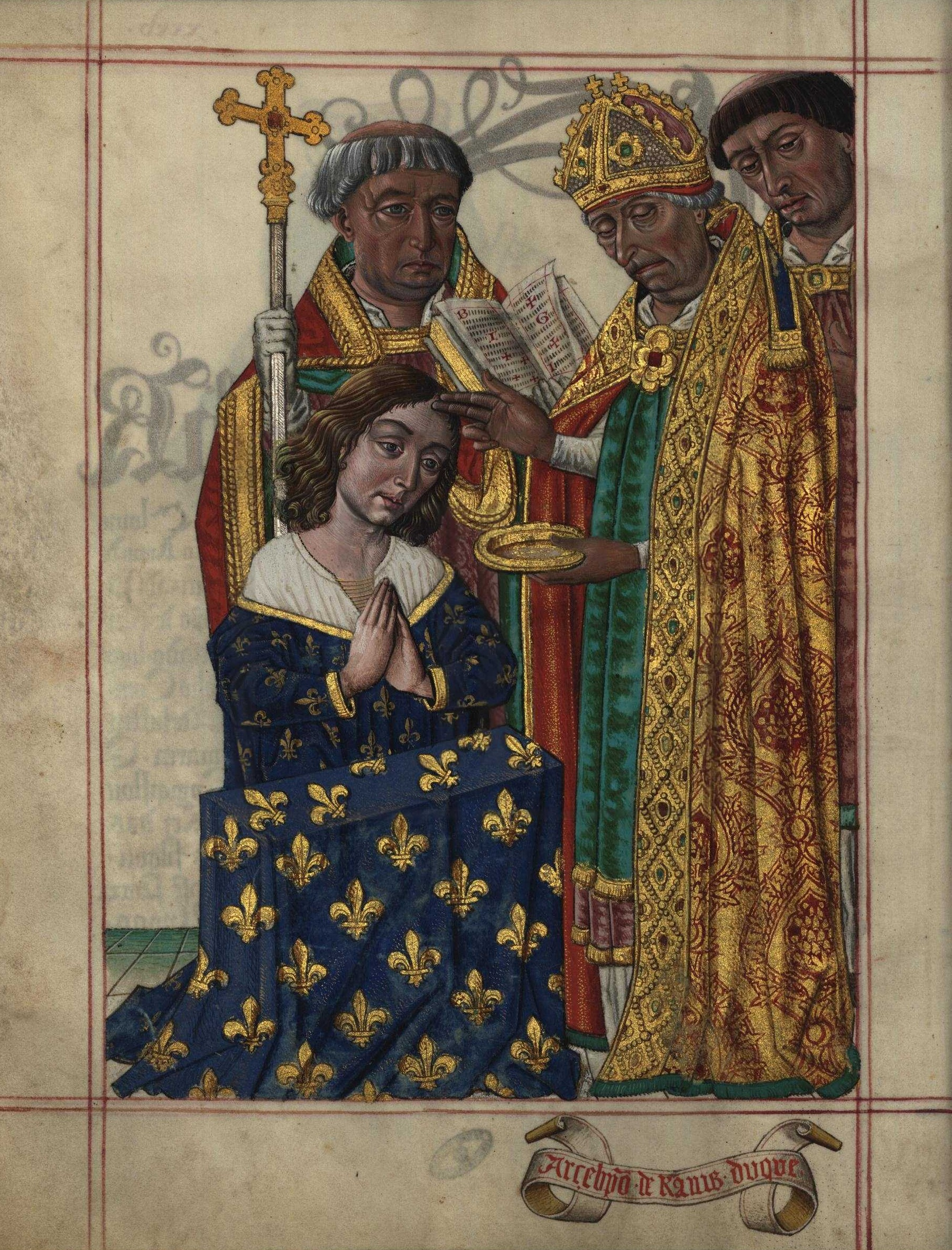
Archbishop of Reims, consecration of the King of France (fl 35^{v})

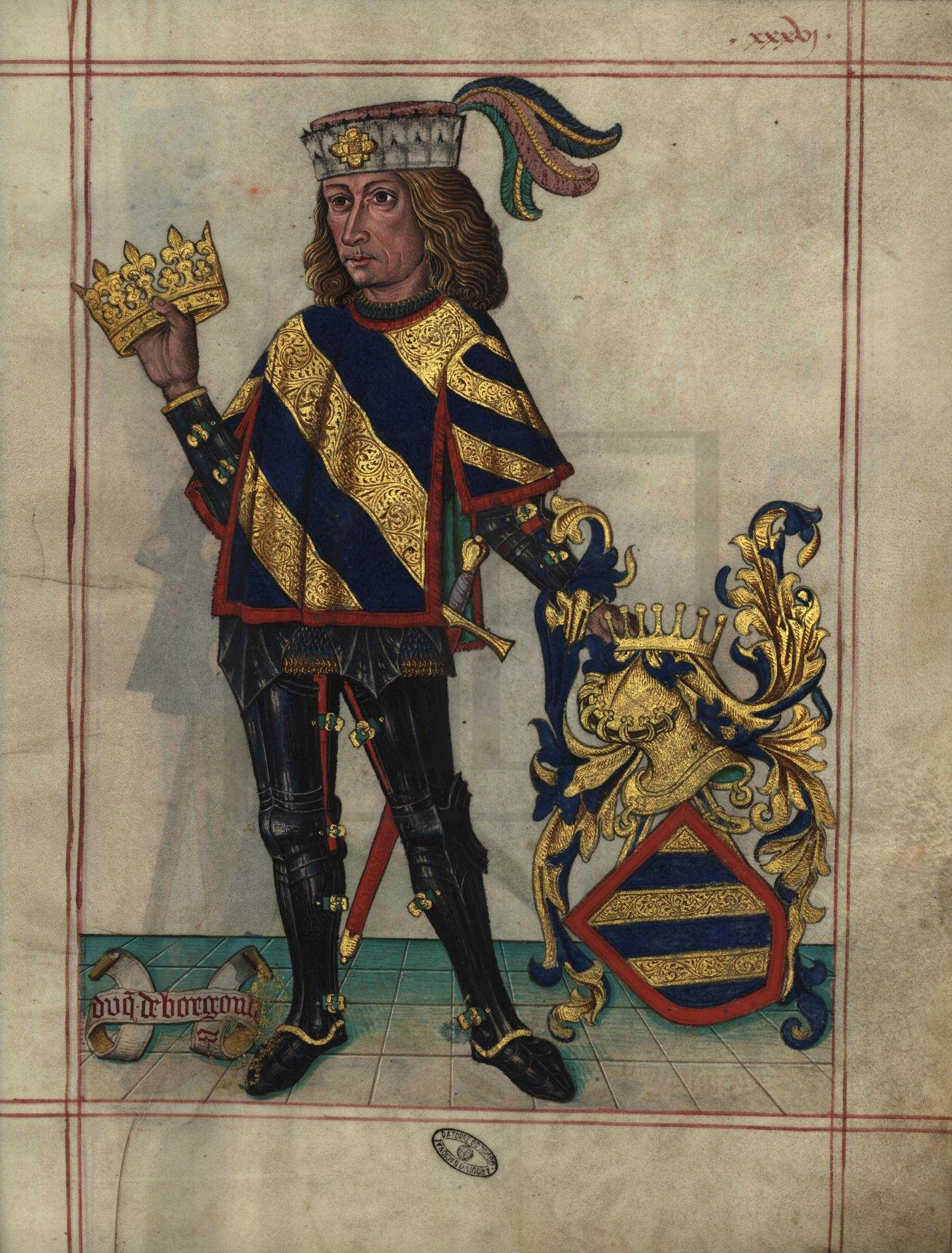
Coat of arms of the Duke of Burgundy (fl 36^{r})

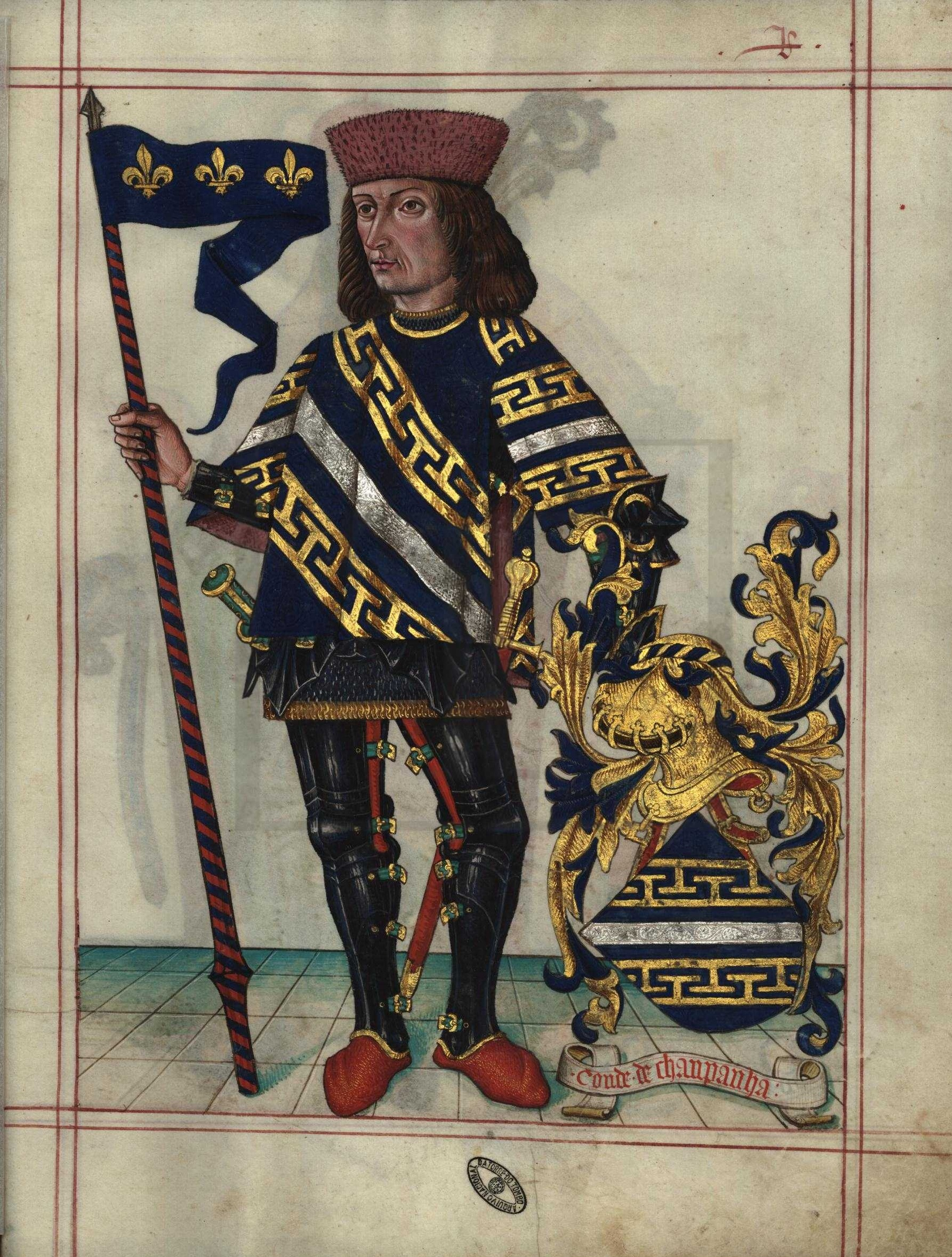
Coat of arms of the Count of Champagne (fl 40^{r})

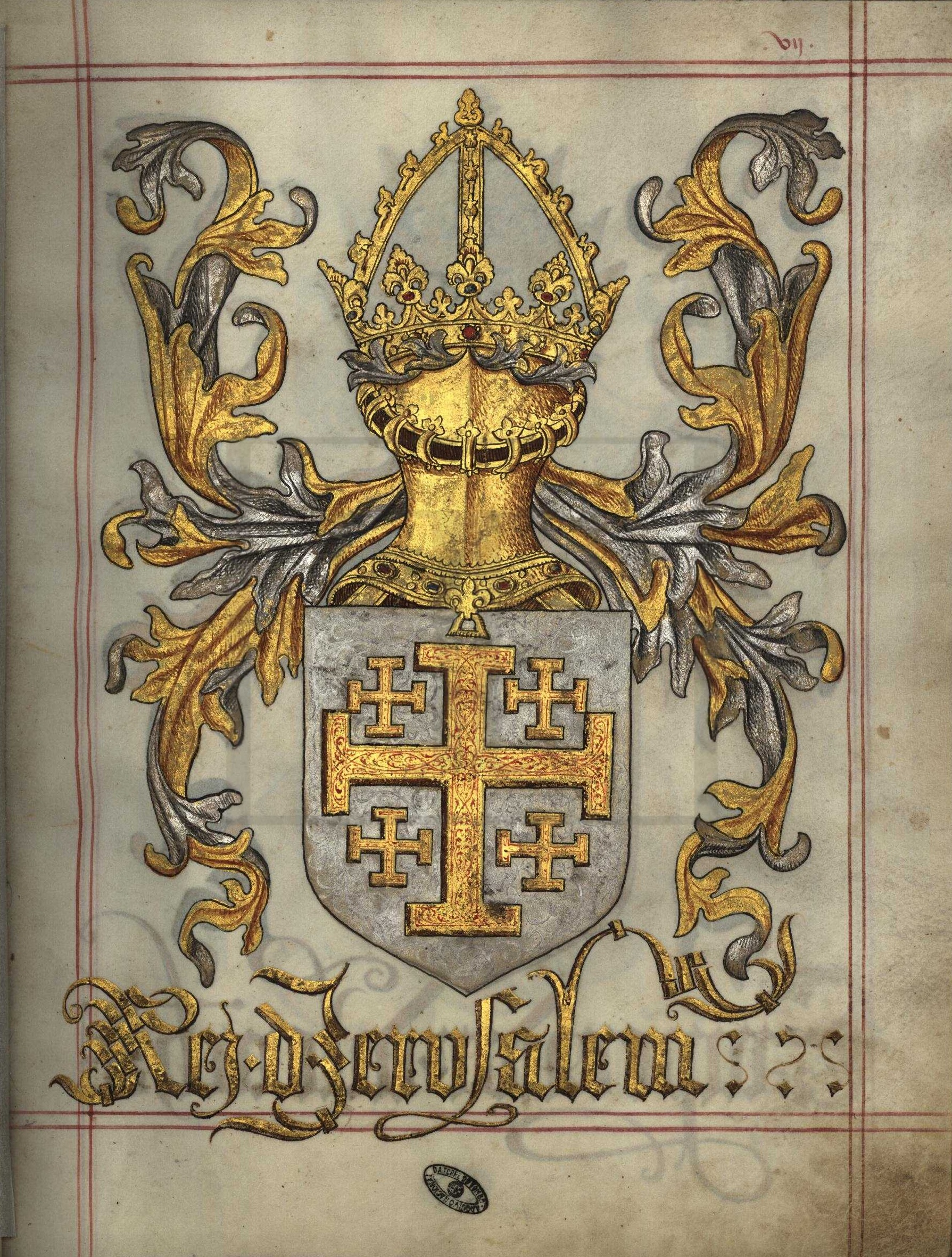
Coat of arms of the King of Jerusalem (fl 7^{r})

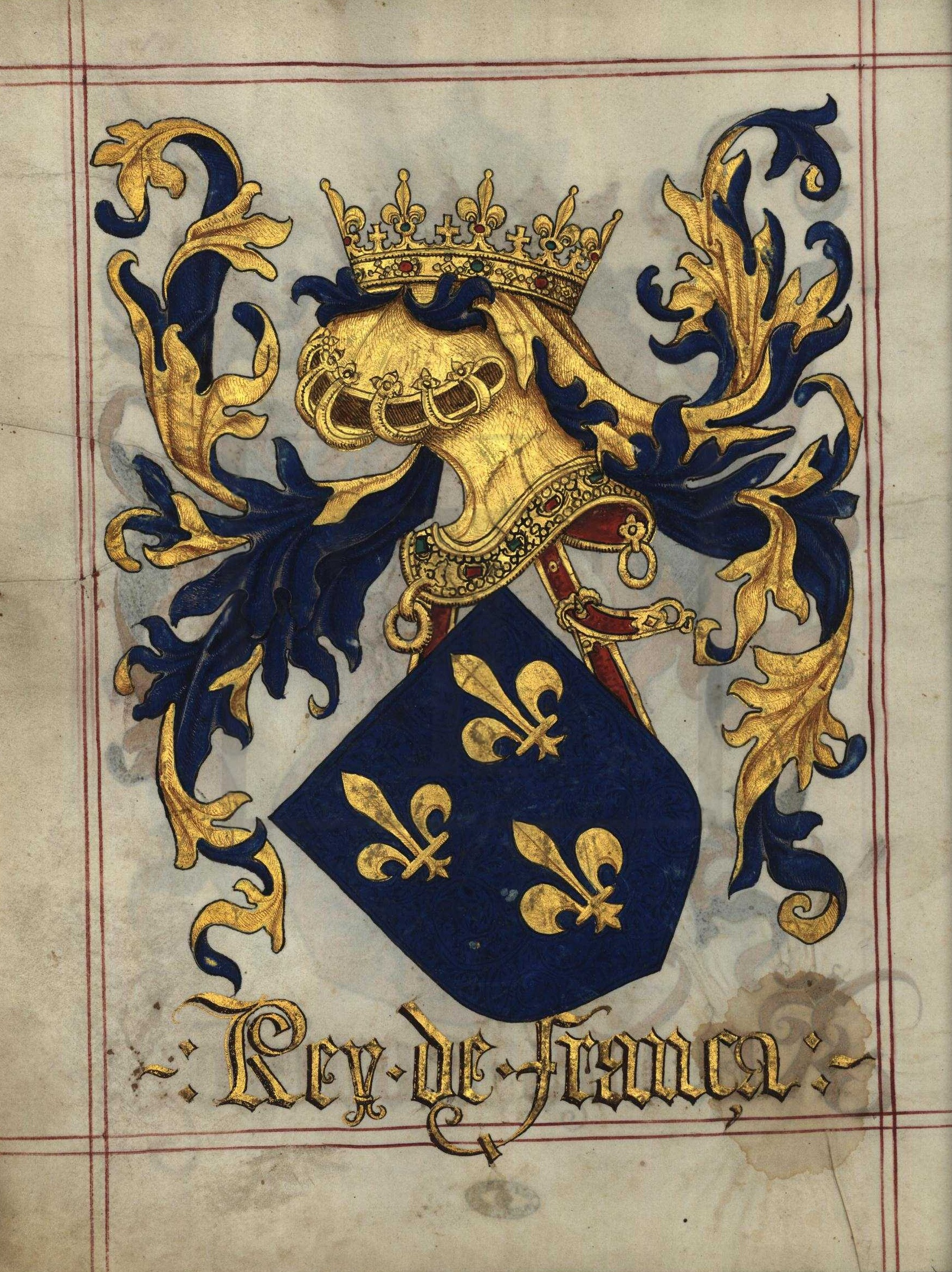
Coat of arms of the King of France (fl 8^{v})

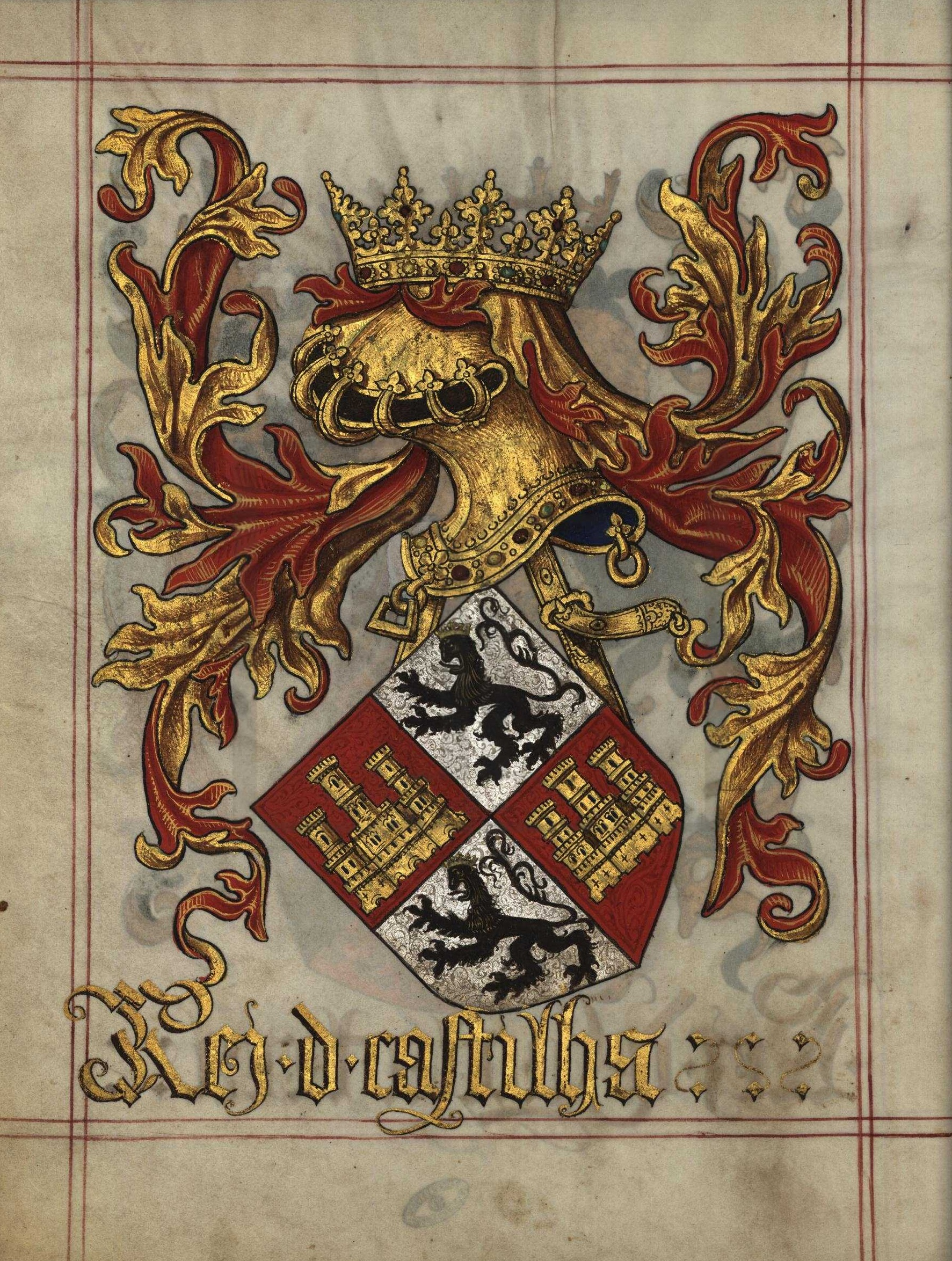
Coat of arms of the King of Castile (fl 9^{v})

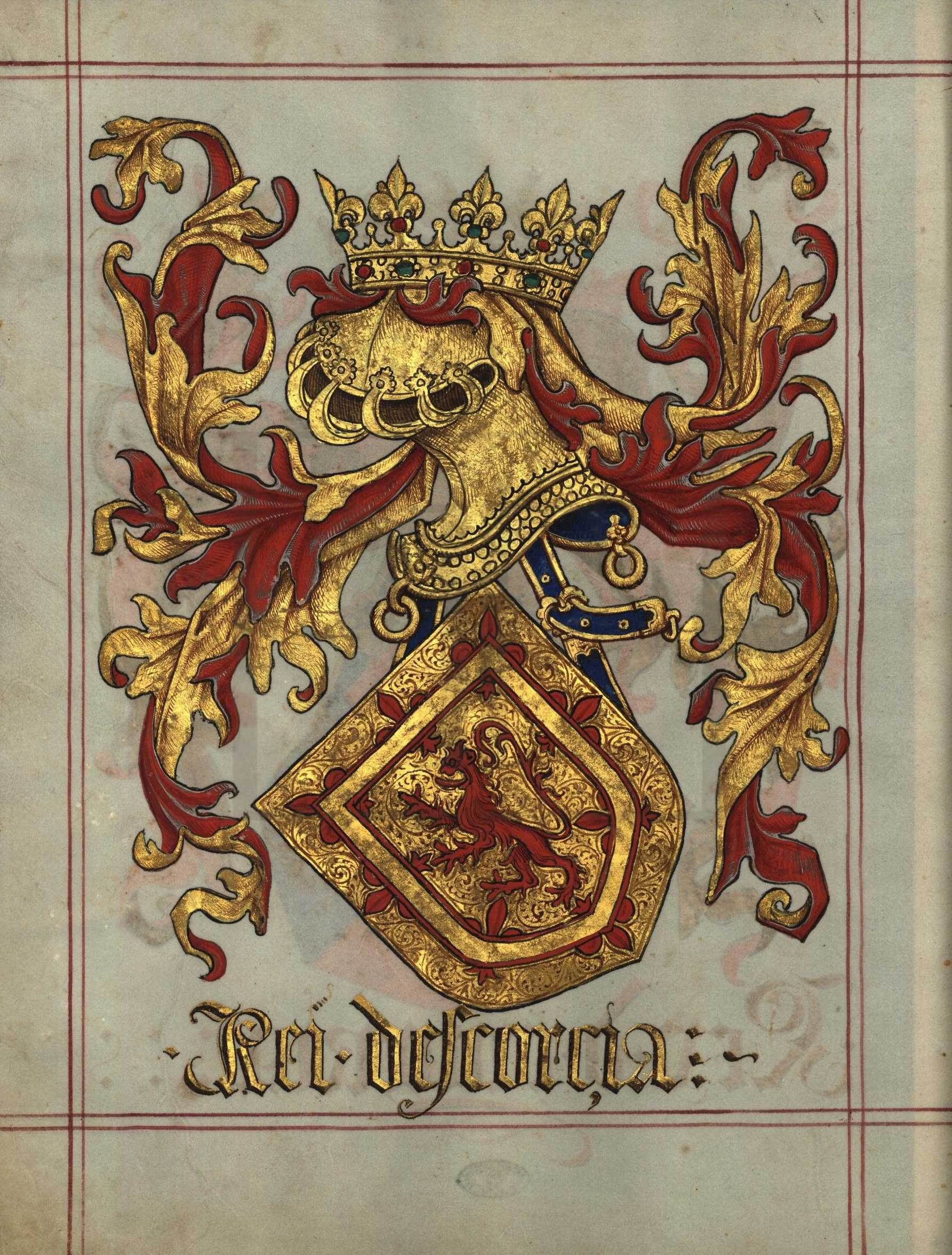
Coat of arms of the King of Scotland (fl 14^{v})

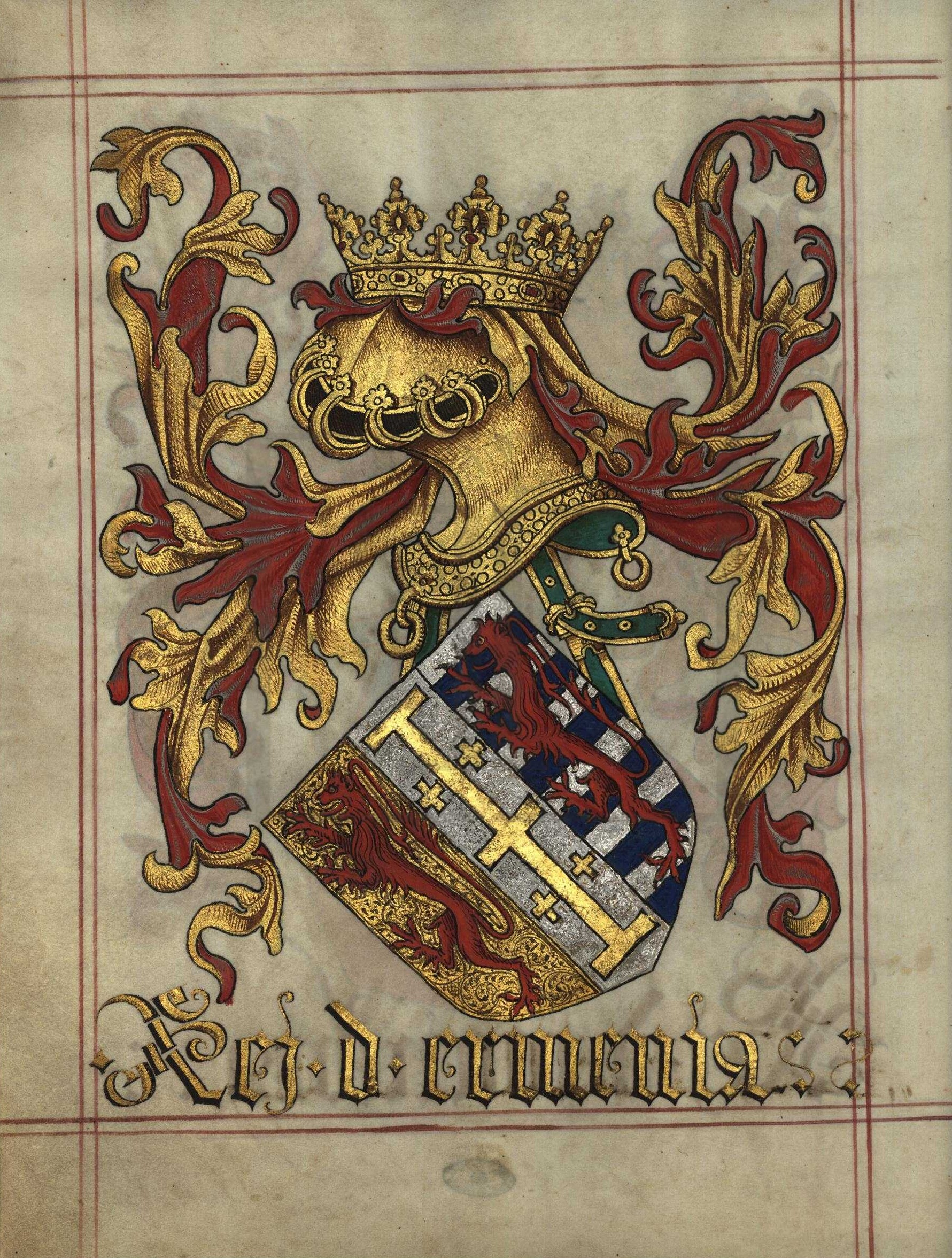
Coat of arms of the King of Armenia (fl 19^{v})

== Bibliography ==
- Livro do Armeiro-Mor (1509). 2nd edition, Portuguese Academy of History/Inapa Editions, 2007.
- ALBUQUERQUE, Martim de and LIMA, João Paulo de Abreu e: "Introdução, Notas...", in Livro da Nobreza e Perfeiçam das Armas, Inapa Editions, 1987.
- AZEVEDO, Francisco de Simas Alves de: Uma Interpretação Histórico-Cultural do Livro do Armeiro-Mor. Private edition, 1966.
- FREIRE, Anselmo Braamcamp: Brasões da Sala de Sintra, Vol. I-III (1921). 3rd edition, National Press-House of the Currency, 1996.
- GOMES, Rita Costa: The Making of a Court Society. Kings and Nobles in Late Medieval Portugal. Cambridge University Press, 2003.
- MONTEIRO, Nuno Gonçalo: "17th and 18th century Portuguese Nobility in the European Context: A historiographical overview". e-Journal of Portuguese History, Vol. 1, number 1, Summer 2003.
- PIZARRO, José Augusto Sotto Mayor: Linhagens Medievais Portuguesas: Genealogias e Estratégias 1279-1325, vol. I-III. Modern University of Porto, 1999.
- SEIXAS, Miguel Metelo de and ROSA, Maria de Lurdes: Estudos de Heráldica Medieval, Caminhos Romanos, 2012.
