= Filipa de Eça =

Portuguese nun (c.1480-c.1551)

D. Filipa de Eça
- Abbess of Lorvão Abbey
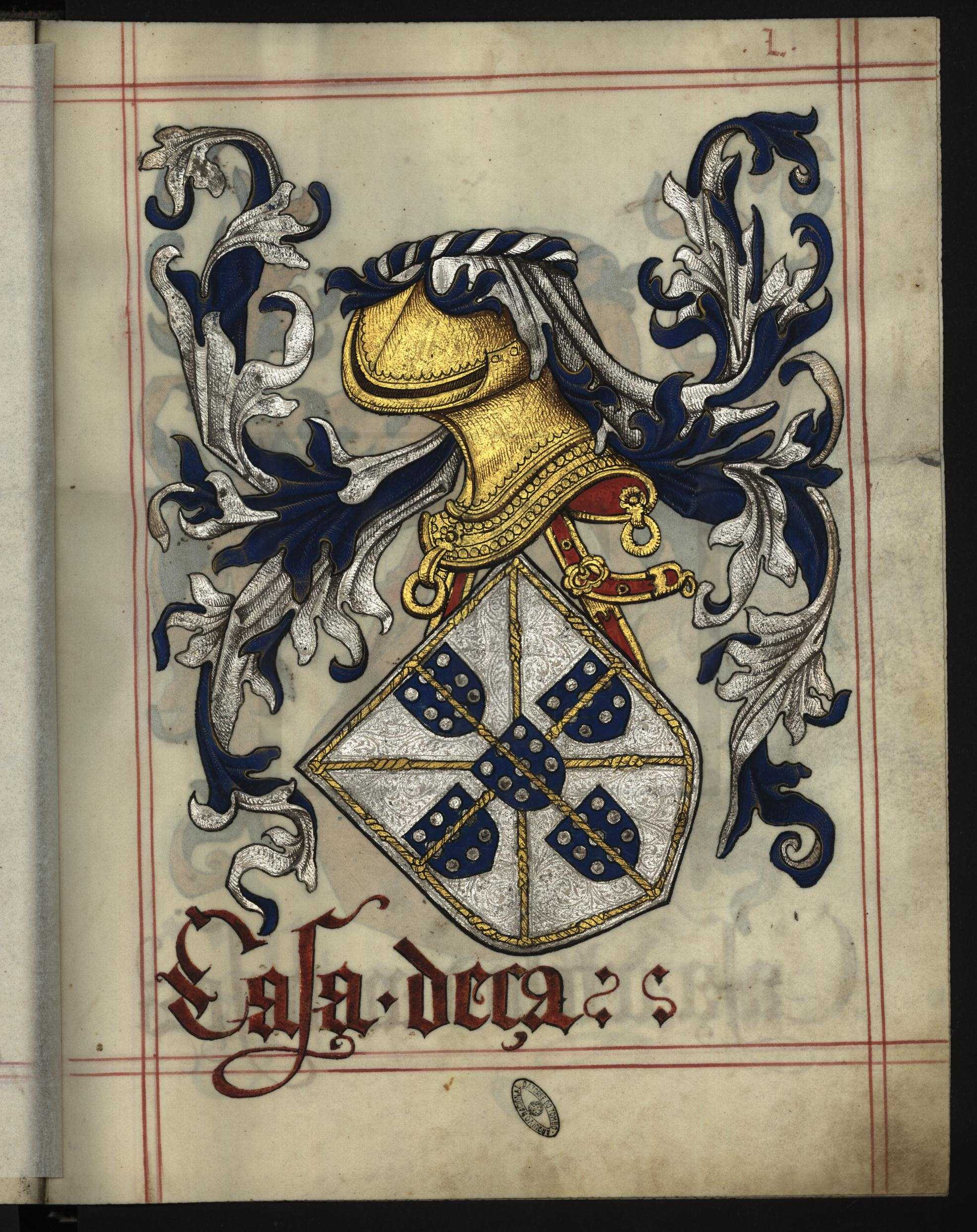
- Coat of Arms of the Eça family

Abbess of Lorvão
- Tenure: 1538
- Predecessor: D. Margarida de Eça
- Successor: D. Milícia de Melo
- Born: c. 1480; Kingdom of Portugal
- Died: 1551 (aged 70–71); Kingdom of Portugal
- Noble family: Eça
- Significant other: João Gomes de Abreu
- Issue: Francisca de Abreu
- Father: Dom Pedro de Eça, constable of the Castle of Moura
- Mother: ?
- Occupation: Nun

Filipa de Eça (c. 1480 - 1551) was a 16th-century Portuguese nun. She was a great-great-granddaughter of king Pedro I of Portugal and Inês de Castro. Elected as Abbess of the Monastery of Lorvão in 1538, she was later expelled by king João III. She appealed the expulsion to the Pope, who nearly 15 years later confirmed her right to be restored to her dignity as Abbess of Lorvão.

== Biography ==
D. Filipa de Eça was the bastard daughter of Dom Pedro de Eça, Constable of the castle of Moura, by an unknown woman. She was a great-granddaughter in the male line of Infante John, Duke of Valencia de Campos, son of King D. Pedro I of Portugal and Inês de Castro.

She started her religious career at a young age, first as Abbess of the Monastery of Celas (since the year 1500) and then of the Abbey of Vale de Madeiros. Later in the 16th century she was elected Abbess of the Monastery of Lorvão.

Until 1537 the abbesses of Lorvão were always elected for life mandates. It was only from that year on that elections for mandates of three years began to take effect. The Eça family already had a remarkable tradition in the position, as between the years 1472 and 1521 the Abbess of the monastery was D. Catarina de Eça, Filipa's paternal aunt; and from 1521 to 1537 her cousin, D. Margarida de Eça, was her successor as Abbess. Margarida was a widower, having been previously married to João Mendes de Vasconcelos, lord of Alvarenga.

=== Election to Abbess and expulsion by royal order ===
Filipa de Eça was thus formally elected Abbess of Lorvão, on 11 February 1538, in succession to her cousin Margarida. However, King John III would soon react against the election, by ordering the expulsion of the new Abbess, who in his opinion had been appointed "illegally".

On 20 April 1538 (Easter Eve), D. Filipa was physically expelled from Lorvão, by a military force acting at the behest of the king, composed of the "magistrate and the judge of Coimbra, accompanied by bailiffs, notaries, carpenters, locksmiths, soldiers and many people on foot and on horses, including riflemen, crossbowmen and archers". This force assaulted the Monastery and, overcoming the resistance of the nuns who tried to protect their abbess "by punching and biting", dragged Dona Filipa out of the convent. The next day she was taken to the monastery of Celas.

After this scene took place, the position of Abbess was given to another nun, Dona Milícia de Melo, who was transferred from the Monastery of Arouca to that of Lorvão, by order of the king. However, D. Filipa and the nuns of Lorvão immediately appealed the royal decision, seeking the support of Pope Paul III, thus starting a dispute between the Portuguese court and the Papacy, that would last for about 15 years.

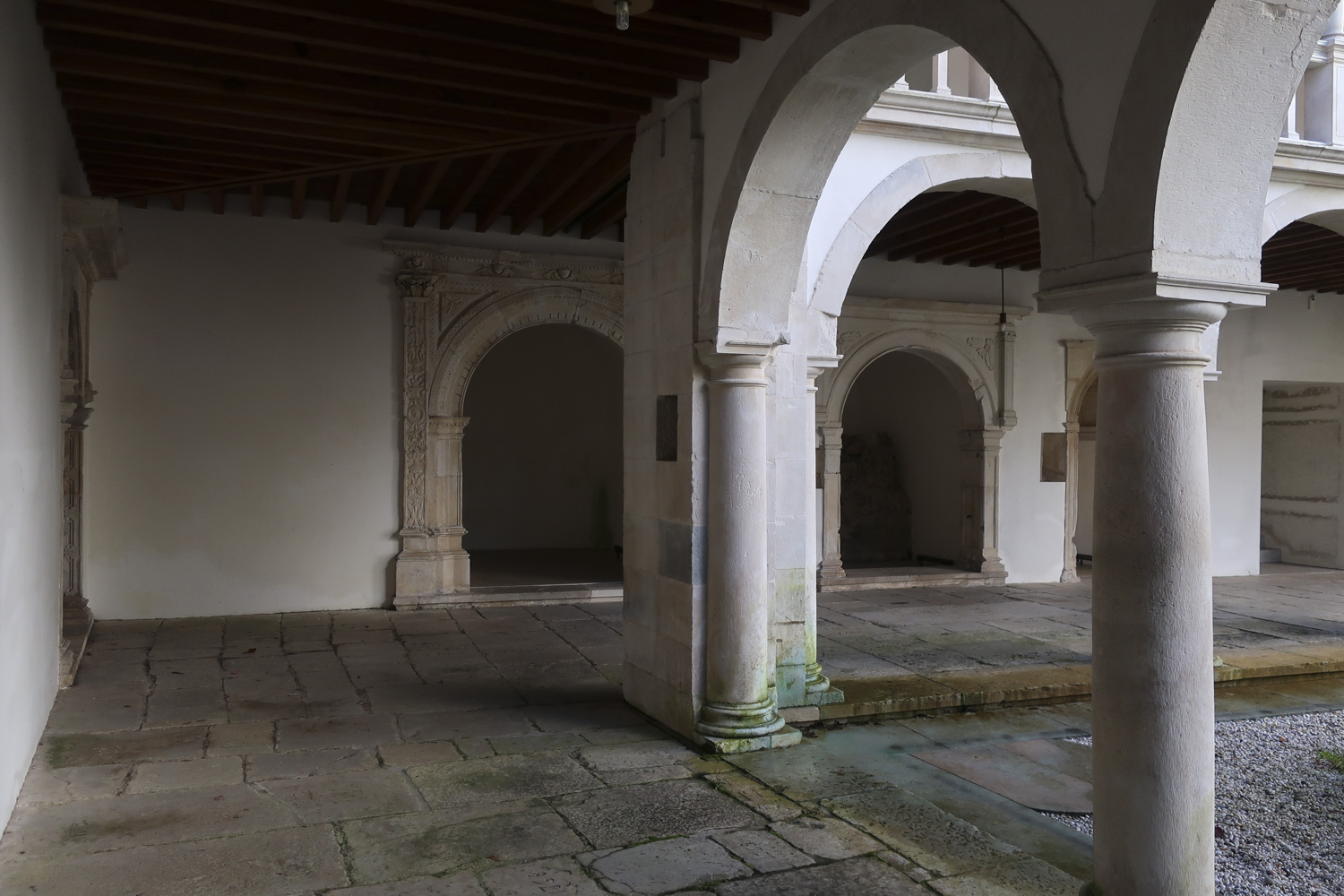
The cloister of the Monastery of Lorvão, from where D. Filipa de Eça was forcibly expelled, by order of D. João III, on 20 April 1538

For several years, at the turn of the 15th century, Filipa de Eça kept a close relationship with her lover, the poet and navigator João Gomes de Abreu, a paternal nephew of the Bishop of Viseu. From that relationship, a daughter was born.

In Portugal, by the late 15th and early 16th centuries, it became notable how several nuns from the Eça family were involved in alleged "illicit love relationships" with men from the Abreu family.

Thus, a half-aunt of Dona Filipa, Brites (also called Beatriz) de Eça, Abbess of the Monastery of Celas, may have had a love affair with the above-mentioned Bishop of Viseu, Dom João Gomes de Abreu, that produced two children (however, recent historical studies have raised some doubts about the real existence of this hypothetical relationship). Another aunt of Filipa, the aforementioned D. Catarina de Eça, Abbess of Lorvão, was the lover of Pedro Gomes de Abreu, Lord of Regalados and great-nephew of the said Bishop of Viseu. Finally, D. Joana de Eça - daughter of another aunt of Filipa, Branca de Eça, by her husband João Rodrigues de Azevedo - also Abbess at Celas, had a relationship with Vasco Gomes de Abreu, a brother of D. Filipa de Eça's lover, the poet João Gomes.

The Portuguese historian and genealogist Anselmo Braamcamp Freire once commented, in this regard, that the nuns of the Eça family seemed to "have taken it upon themselves to procreate bastards from the Abreus". And he further states that, in a letter from King John III of Portugal, dated 31 August 1543, delivered by the Ambassador of Portugal in Rome to Pope Paul III, the King asks for Papal help in order to combat the alleged "dissolute behavior" of the nuns of the Eça family at the Lorvão Monastery.

=== The legal case of D. Filipa in the Roman Rota ===
However, in the long dispute that would set D. Filipa de Eça against king João III, the nun ended up winning. The Roman Rota, the supreme court of the Catholic Church, ruled in favor of the Abbess, despite constant diplomatic pressures from the Portuguese monarch - even after D. Filipa, by that time already "an old grandmother", was allegedly found in a somewhat irregular situation, in the company of a priest and his lover, a Catholic nun. In the end, in the Papal brief Cum dilectes, dated 12 September 1551, Pope Julius III recommended that king John III reinstall Dona Filipa, who by apostolic letters had been restored to her dignity of Abbess of Lorvão.

Furthermore, D. Filipa never felt intimidated by the monarch's antagonism. This can be seen in a letter she wrote to King John III, in the month of May 1544, in which - responding to a royal summons to stay fifteen leagues away from the monastery of Lorvão - she reminds the monarch of the sentences already issued by the Roman Rota in support of her position, and she concludes her text by stating that "due to the very great virtues and royal zeal for justice of your Royal Highness" the king should, instead of subpoenaing her, "put me back in possession of my abbey".

Thus, Anselmo Braamcamp Freire concludes his observations by saying that, given the way in which D. Filipa de Eça dared to face the King, and obtained Papal support for her cause she must be considered "a true heroine".

D. Filipa de Eça died shortly after the publication of the papal brief, and thus never formally resumed her position as Abbess of Lorvão.

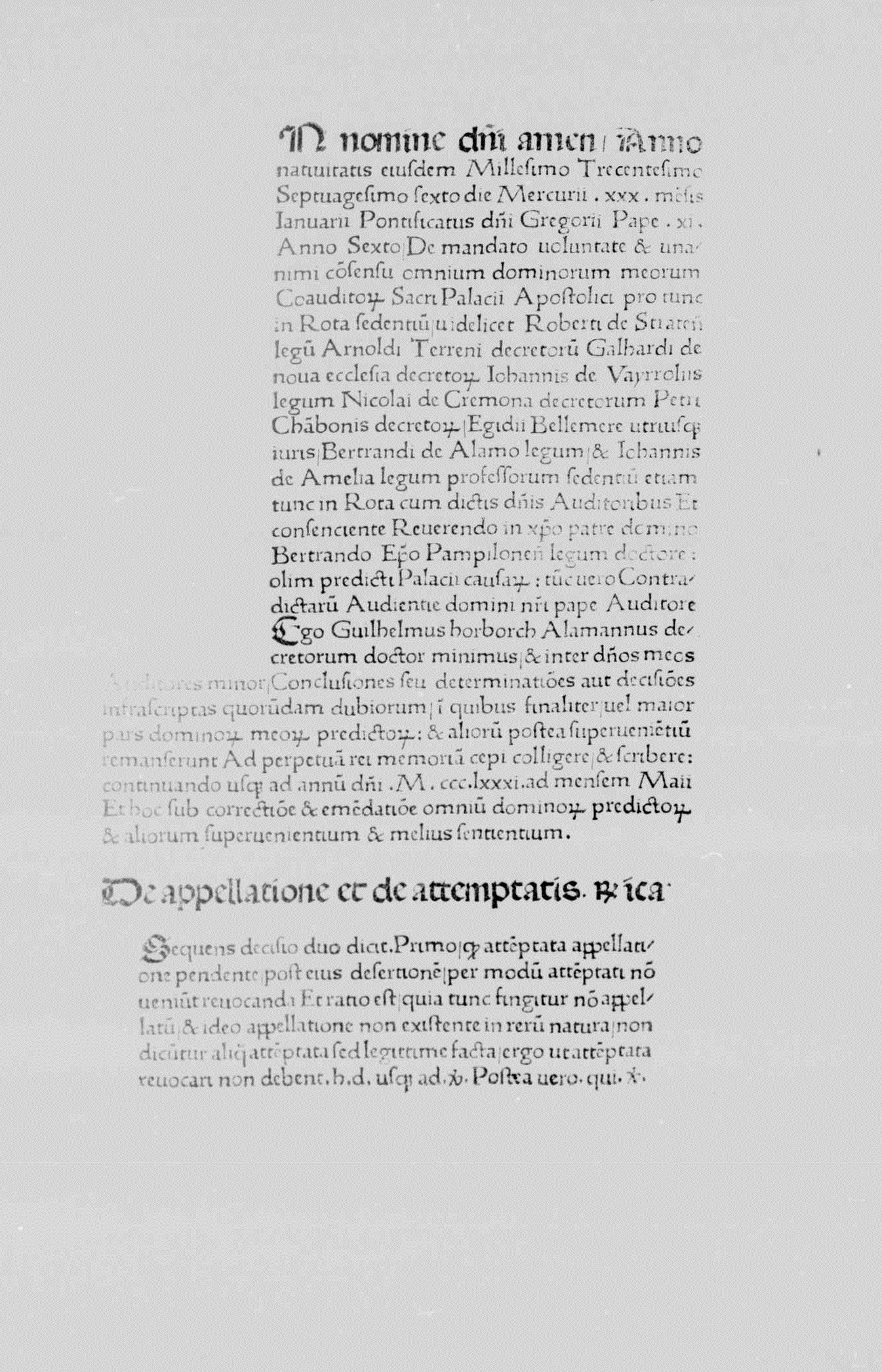
An example of a decision by the Roman Rota, the Court of the Catholic Church that ruled against king John III of Portugal, by confirming the right of D. Filipa de Eça to be restored as Abbess of Lorvão

== Possible reasons for the royal opposition to her election as Abbess of Lorvão ==
Recent historical research into the causes of the dispute between the Portuguese monarch and the Abbess of Lorvão has raised the question of whether there may have been some deliberate exaggeration, on the part of king John III, regarding the supposed "immorality" of D. Filipa's behavior and that of the other nuns of the Eça family.

Thus, in 1533, when an official visitation took place to the Monastery of Lorvão (which at the time had D. Margarida de Eça as Abbess) the visitor Dom Edme de Saulieu, abbot of Clairvaux, was received in a solemn procession and he observed that "the nuns are obedient and the Abbess is very respectful". Only one single irregular case was then detected, among the many nuns of the Convent - that of a nun arrested for having married after her profession of faith. Everything at the time indicated that the future of the Monastery would continue to unfold in a peaceful and orderly manner.

This evidence contrasts sharply with the descriptions of life in Lorvão, made by king John III, in the many letters he sent, over the years, to his Ambassador in Rome, with the purpose of putting pressure on the Pope (ultimately, without success) to confirm the expulsion of D. Filipa de Eça. Indeed, the above-mentioned Cistercian visitor did not find in Lorvão any of the irregularities that he had noticed and reported in other similar institutions of that epoch.

The historian Isabel Drumond Braga puts forward several hypotheses, in order to discover the real reasons that may have led king John III to interfere in the election of the Abbess of Lorvão.

It is possible the king had a particular, personal interest in trying to put an end to the rule of the "Eça dynasty" over Lorvão Abbey. Perhaps this was a consequence of remaining frictions related to dynastic disputes, dating back to the Portuguese succession crisis of 1383-1385 - disputes between the descendants of Infante John, Duke of Valencia de Campos (that is, the Eça family) and those of John I, founder of the royal house of Aviz, whose head was now his descendant, the king John III (a renowned historian of the Cistercian Order has put forward this hypothesis). Or perhaps the king was mainly interested in removing D. Filipa in order to eventually nominate a member of the royal family to be the head of the Monastery.

Isabel Drumond Braga leans towards the latter hypothesis, mainly because, after the death of John III, the regent Catherine of Austria ended up appointing to the position of Abbess of Lorvão, in 1560, a nun, Dona Bernarda de Lencastre, who happened to be a granddaughter of king Manuel I (she was the bastard daughter of the Cardinal-Infante Afonso of Portugal).

== Progeny ==
From her relationship with the aforementioned navigator and poet, João Gomes de Abreu, nicknamed "o das Trovas" (the one of the poems) - a daughter was born:

- Francisca de Abreu (c. 1500 - c. 1573), prioress of the Monastery of São Bento da Avé Maria in Porto, and mother of the Jesuit martyr, Blessed Inácio de Azevedo.

== Genealogical summary ==
Pedro I (1320–1367); King of Portugal
Fernando I (1345–1383); King of Portugal	Infante João (1349–1397); Duke of Valencia de Campos (Spanish title)	João I (1357–1433); King of Portugal
Beatrice (1372–1408); Queen de jure	Ferdinand of Portugal, Lord of Eça (c.1378-c.1460)	Duarte I (1391–1438); King of Portugal
Dom Pedro de Eça, Constable of the Castle of Moura (c.1430- 1492 )
D. Filipa de Eça (c.1480–1551); Abbess of Lorvão Abbey	Portuguese Royal House
