= Rui Gomes de Abreu =

Portuguese nobleman and politician

- Lord of Elvas
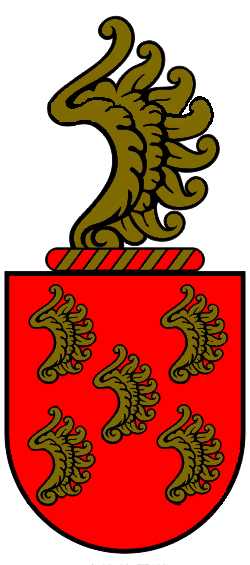
- Coat of Arms of Abreu
- Born: 15th-century Portugal
- Died: 16th-century Portugal
- Spouse: Inês Brandão

Rui Gomes de Abreu (c.1460–1530?) was a Portuguese nobleman, who served as Alcaide Mayor of Elvas.

== Biography ==
Rui was the son of Pedro Gomes de Abreu and Catarina de Eça, a noble lady, who was Abbess of the Convent of Lorvão. She was the daughter of Infante Fernando, Lord of Eça and Leonor de Teive.

Rui Gomes de Abreu was married to Inês Brandão, daughter of Fernão Brandão Sanches, comendador of Afife and Cabanas, and Catarina Fagundes, belonging to noble Portuguese Galician family.
