= Urgeiriça =

- Village
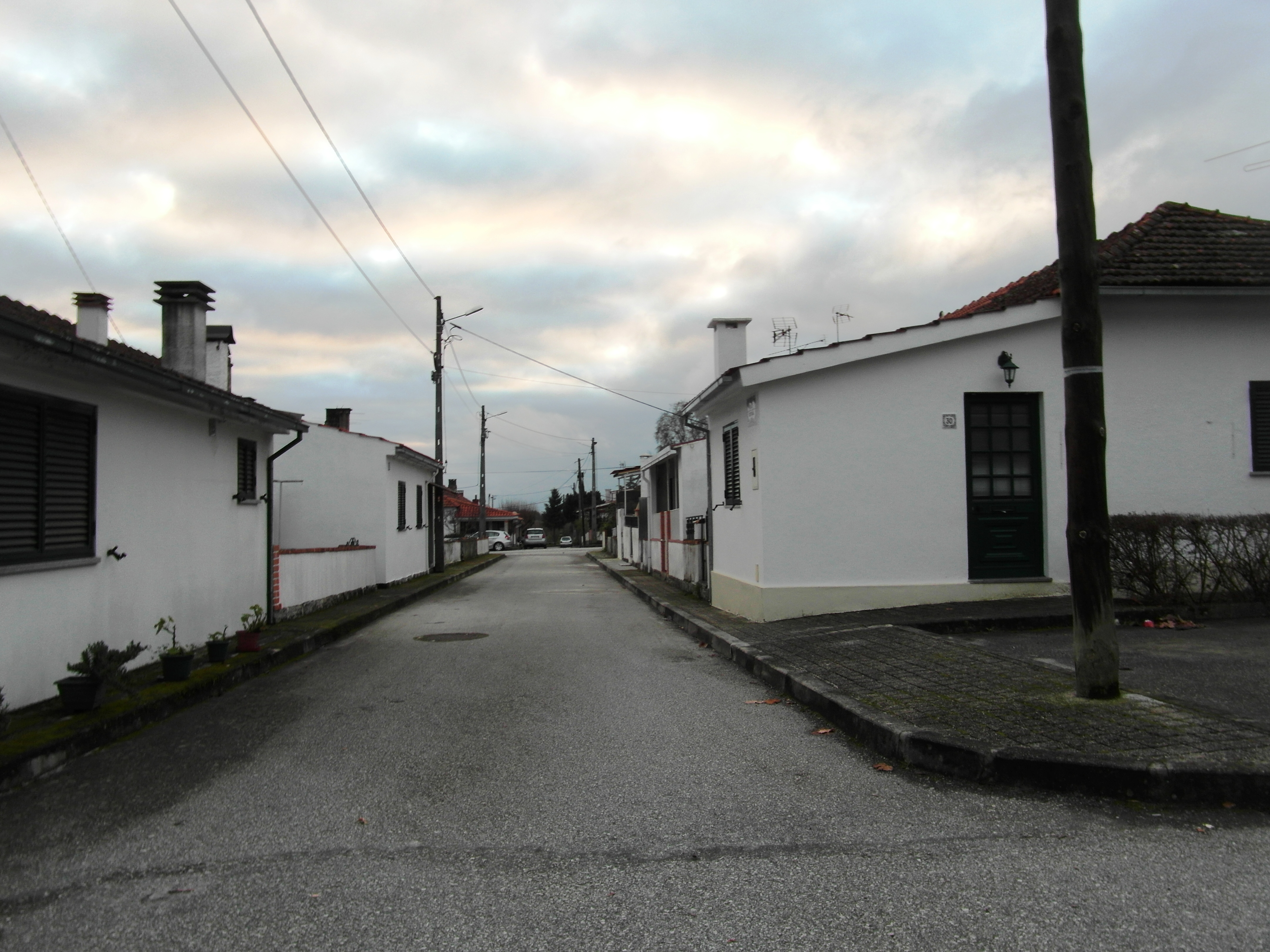
- Street in Urgeiriça
- Interactive map of Urgeiriça
- Country: Portugal
- District: Viseu
- Municipality: Nelas
- Parish: Canas de Senhorim
- Demonym: Urgeiricense
- Time zone: UTC (WET)
  - Summer (DST): UTC+1 (WEST)
- Postal Codes: 3525-301 to 314

Urgeiriça is a portuguese village in the parish of Canas de Senhorim, in the municipality of Nelas, district of Viseu, known locally by its radium and uranium mines, which worked since 1913 until their closing in 2001.

== Urgeiriça Mines ==
=== History ===
Radium mined during the early years of this site supplied Madame Curie and, during World War II, control of the uranium resources was a source of concern for the dueling countries. Many countries have purchased uranium mined and then processed into yellowcake from this site including Iraq in 1980.

The Urgeiriça mines were managed by the National Uranium Company (Portuguese: Empresa Nacional de Urânio – ENU) between 1977 and their closing. The town of Urgeiriça was built using local materials to home the mine workers.

The working conditions were particularly harsh, with 9 consecutive hour shifts in extreme humidity and with poor air quality, filled with small particles, including radioactive ones and radon gas, as well as the extensive usage of sulfuric acid inside the mines.

=== Decline and closing ===
Around 2004, the factory had a stockpile of approximately 200 metric tons of uranium, after a purchase of 127 tonnes by Germany.

=== Controversy ===
Uranium's radioactivity, associated to the poor worker's safety conditions (for example, it was common for workers to place their food in radioactive contaminated timber, as it was common for them to bring their contaminated uniforms back home) are significant factors in the high number of cancer patients among the former workers of the plant, with an estimated death toll of over 170.

In 1993, the plant started the process of selling the workers homes to individuals. In 2008, studies were realised, flagging 135 homes for higher than acceptable radiation levels.

== Points of interest ==
- Urgeiriça Mines
- Saint Barbara Chapel
- Hotel Urgeiriça
