= Vilar Seco =

Vilar Seco may refer to the following places in Portugal:

- Vilar Seco (Nelas), a parish in the municipality of Nelas
- Vilar Seco (Vimioso), a parish in the municipality of Vimioso
- Vilar Seco de Lomba, a parish in the municipality of Vinhais
