= Lopo Gomes de Abreu =

Portuguese nobleman

- Lord
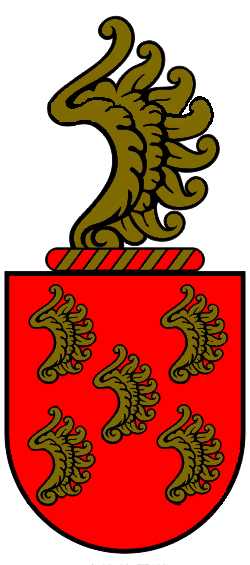
- Born: 15th-century Kingdom of Portugal
- Baptised: 15th-century
- Died: Kingdom of Portugal
- Noble family: Abreu

Lopo Gomes de Abreu (1420–70s?) was a Portuguese nobleman, Lord of Regalados.

== Biography ==
Lopo was the son of Pedro Gomes de Abreu (3rd Lord of Regalados) and Aldonça de Sousa, descendant of Afonso III of Portugal. His wife was Inês de Soutomaior, daughter of Leonel de Lima and Filipa da Cunha, descendant of Leonor Telles de Meneses.

Lopo Gomes de Abreu was a direct descendant of Gonçalo Martins de Abreu nobleman born in the 11th-century in France.
