= António de Abreu =

Portuguese navigator (c. 1480 – c. 1514)

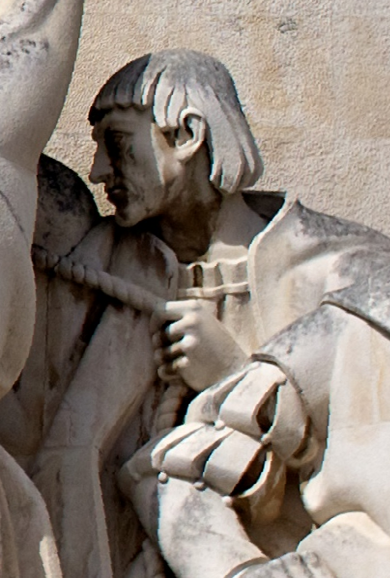
- Effigy of António de Abreu in the Monument of the Discoveries, in Lisbon, Portugal
- Born: c. 1480; Madeira, Portugal
- Died: c. 1514; Azores, Portugal
- Occupations: Navigator; naval officer
- Known for: Leader of the first European expedition to reach Timor and the Banda Islands.
- Father: João Fernandes de Andrade

António de Abreu (c. 1480 – c. 1514) was a Portuguese navigator and naval officer. He participated under the command of Afonso de Albuquerque in the conquest of Ormus in 1507 and Malacca in 1511, where he was injured. Departing from Malacca in November 1511 with four ships, in an exploratory voyage to the Spice Islands of Maluku, he led the first European expedition to reach Timor and the Banda Islands, in Indonesia, in 1512.

== Biography ==
Abreu was born about 1480 in Madeira, the son of nobleman João Fernandes de Andrade. After serving in Morocco, he fought in the campaigns of Afonso de Albuquerque in India and the Red Sea. On 25 July 1511, during the conquest of Malacca, António de Abreu led the Chinese junk that went up the Malacca River at high tide, allowing the Portuguese contingent to land and conquer the city in August. Severely wounded by a musket shot in the face, he lost several teeth and part of his tongue but indignantly refused Albuquerque's request to hand over his command.

=== Expeditions ===
In November 1511, after sending ambassadors to Pegu and Siam one month before leaving Malacca, Albuquerque trusted Abreu with the command of a fleet of four ships sailing in search of the Spice Islands. Abreu was captain-major in the ship Santa Catarina, the deputy commander was Francisco Serrão on the ship Sabaia, and a third vessel, a caravel, was under command of Simão Afonso Bisagudo, having as pilot Francisco Rodrigues, an able cartographer who wrote about this expedition.

With a crew of 120 Portuguese and 60 slaves they were guided by Malay pilots, recruited to guide them through Java, the Lesser Sunda Islands and Ambon Island to the Banda Islands, where they arrived in early 1512. They remained there for about a month, buying and filling their ships with nutmeg and cloves.

Abreu then sailed to Amboina. His deputy commander Serrão sailed to the Moluccas but sank, ending in Ternate. Occupied with fighting elsewhere in the archipelago, such as Ambon and Ternate, he returned in 1529.

Abreu returned to Malacca in December 1512. In January 1513, he departed for India with Fernão Pires de Andrade, then sailed for Portugal. He died in the Azores, before reaching continental Portugal.

== See also ==
- Francisco Serrão
- History of Indonesia
