= Pedro Gomes de Abreu =

Portuguese nobleman

- Lord
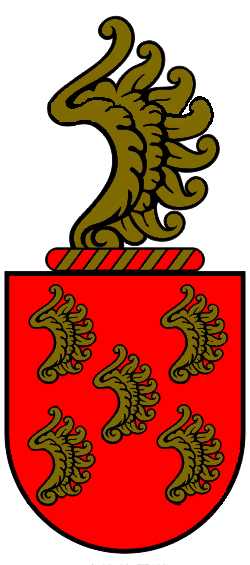
- Coat of Arms of Abreu
- Born: 1390s Kingdom of Portugal
- Died: 1453; Kingdom of Portugal

Pedro Gomes de Abreu (c. 1390-1453) was a Portuguese nobleman, Lord of Regalados. and Alcaide mor de Lapela.

== Biography ==
Born in Portugal, was the son of Lopo Gomes de Abreu and Inês de Soutomaior e Lima, daughter of Leonel de Lima (Viscount of Vila Nova de Cerveira), and Filipa da Cunha. His Mistress was Catarina de Eça, daughter of Infante Fernando, Lord of Eça and granddaughter of Peter I of Portugal.
