= Lapa do Lobo =

- Civil parish
- Location in Portugal
- Coordinates: 40.474°N 7.919°W
- Country: Portugal
- Region: Centro
- Intermunic. comm.: Viseu Dão Lafões
- District: Viseu
- Municipality: Nelas

Area
  - Total: 7.32 km^{2} (2.83 sq mi)

Population (2011)
  - Total: 756
  - Density: 100/km^{2} (270/sq mi)
- Time zone: UTC+00:00 (WET)
  - Summer (DST): UTC+01:00 (WEST)

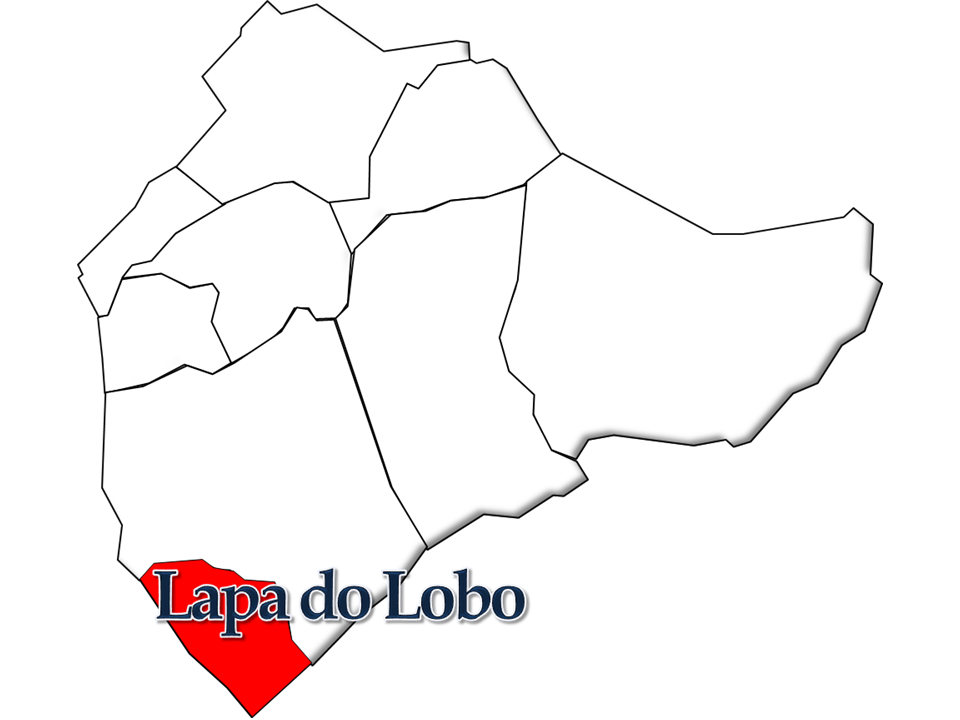
Lapa do Lobo

Lapa do Lobo is a Portuguese parish in the municipality of Nelas. The population in 2011 was 756, in an area of 7.32 km^{2}.
