= Canas de Senhorim =

- Civil parish
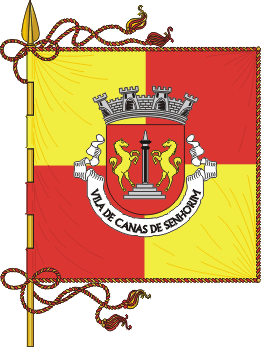
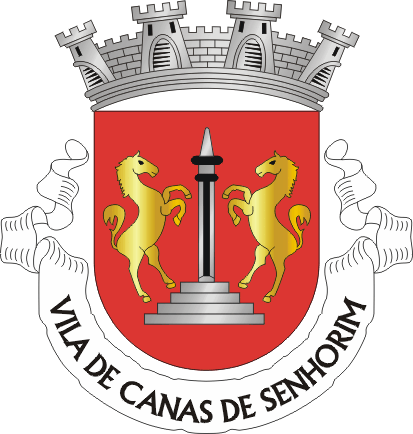
- Flag Coat of arms

- Location in Portugal
- Coordinates: 40.501°N 7.902°W
- Country: Portugal
- Region: Centro
- Intermunic. comm.: Viseu Dão Lafões
- District: Viseu
- Municipality: Nelas

Area
  - Total: 25.45 km^{2} (9.83 sq mi)

Population (2011)
  - Total: 3,509
  - Density: 140/km^{2} (360/sq mi)
- Time zone: UTC+00:00 (WET)
  - Summer (DST): UTC+01:00 (WEST)
- Postal code: 3525
- Area code: 232
- Patron: Santíssimo Salvador

Canas de Senhorim is a civil parish in the municipality (concelho) of Nelas, in the central sub-region of Dão-Lafões in Portugal. The population in 2011 was 3,509, in an area of 25.45 km².

== History ==
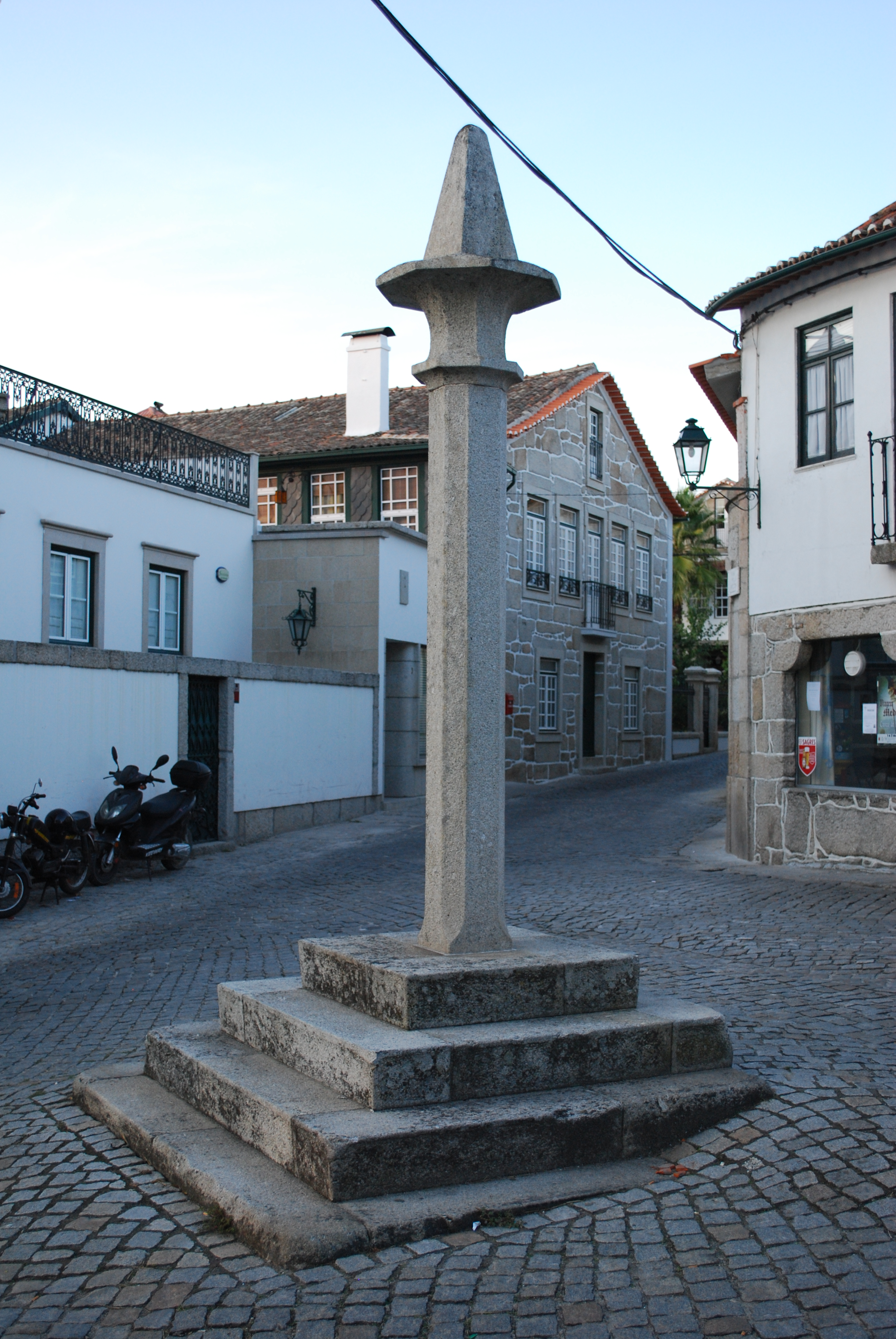
The only visible remnant of Canas de Senhorim's municipal authority, the pillory located in the town square

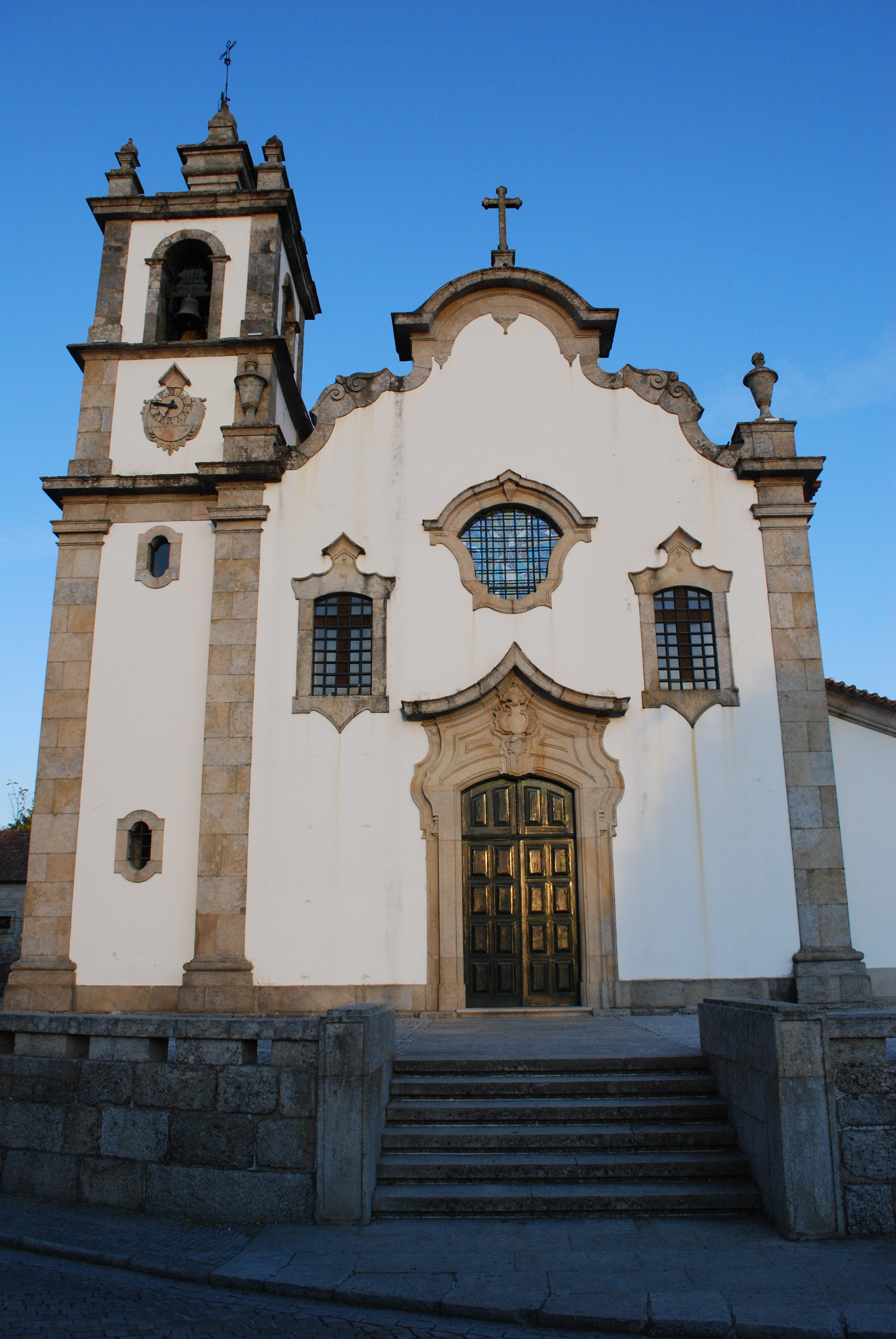
The Baroque-era parochial church of the Saviour (Igreja do Salvador)

A foral (charter) was issued in April 1196 by King Sancho I, and later confirmed by King Manuel I that granted the region the status of municipality, including its one parish.

Canas de Senhorim was a municipality by the 19th century, when the parish of Carvalhal Redondo was annexed. Eventually, its municipal status was extinguished on 9 December 1852; both the municipality of Canas de Senhorim and Senhorim, were included in the reconstituted municipality of Nelas. Fifteen months later, following the decree, the municipality was no more.

Canas was elevated to the status of vila (town) with the passing of bill 15128, on 21 March 1928, at the same time that the civil parish of Santar received its status.

For a better part of the 20th century, Canas de Senhorim was known for its persistent fight to restore its municipal status. A movement was formed to challenge Nelas's politicians authority, protesting through election boycotts, disruption of the rail service through the main town, and public demonstrations in Lisbon. On 3 July 2003, the national assembly approved motion to restore the regions status, but President Jorge Sampaio vetoed the decree a month later, provoking general outrage.

== Geography ==
Within the parish are several localities, small hamlets or villages; these include: Caldas da Felgueira, Póvoa de Santo António, Urgeiriça and Vale de Madeiros.
