= João Fernandes de Andrade =

Portuguese nobleman

- Count of Arco
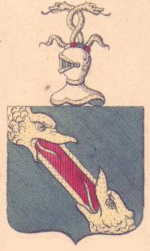
- coat of arms of Andrade
- Born: c. 1470; Portugal
- Baptised: Igreja Nossa Senhora da Consolação (Azores)
- Died: 9 April 1527; Madeira, Portugal
- Noble family: Andrade
- Spouse: Beatriz Gomes de Abreu

João Fernandes de Àndrade (1470s–1527) was a Portuguese nobleman, who served in the Court of Afonso V and John II of Portugal.

== Biography ==
João was born in Portugal, son of Fernão Dias Andrade and Beatriz da Maia, a noble woman, daughter of Fernão Álvares da Maia and Guiomar de Sá. He was married to Beatriz de Abreu, daughter of Rui Gomes de Abreu, governor-mor of Elvas, and Inês Brandão.

João Fernandes de Andrade took part in the military campaigns in North Africa. He and his family were among the first settlers and colonizers of the island Madeira.
