= Fernão Brandão Sanches =

Portuguese nobleman

- Comendador of Afife and Cabanas
- Born: 15th-century Portugal
- Died: 16th-century Portugal
- Buried: Church of São Francisco
- Spouse: Catarina Fagundes

Fernão Brandão Sanches (?-?) was a Portuguese nobleman, Comendador of Afife and Cabanas. He participated in the Portuguese campaigns in North Africa against the Moors.

== Biography ==
Fernão was the son of João Sanches and Isabel Brandão, a noble woman descendant of Martim Afonso Telo de Meneses. His wife was Catarina Fagundes, daughter of Rodrigo Anes Fagundes.

His maternal grandfather, João Brandão, served as the squire of the king Afonso V, and taking an active part in the Battle of Alfarrobeira. He also was treasurer of the Mint of Porto, later he held the position of accountant in the same city.
