= Inácio de Azevedo =

Portuguese missionary (1526–1570)

Blessed Inácio de Azevedo SJ
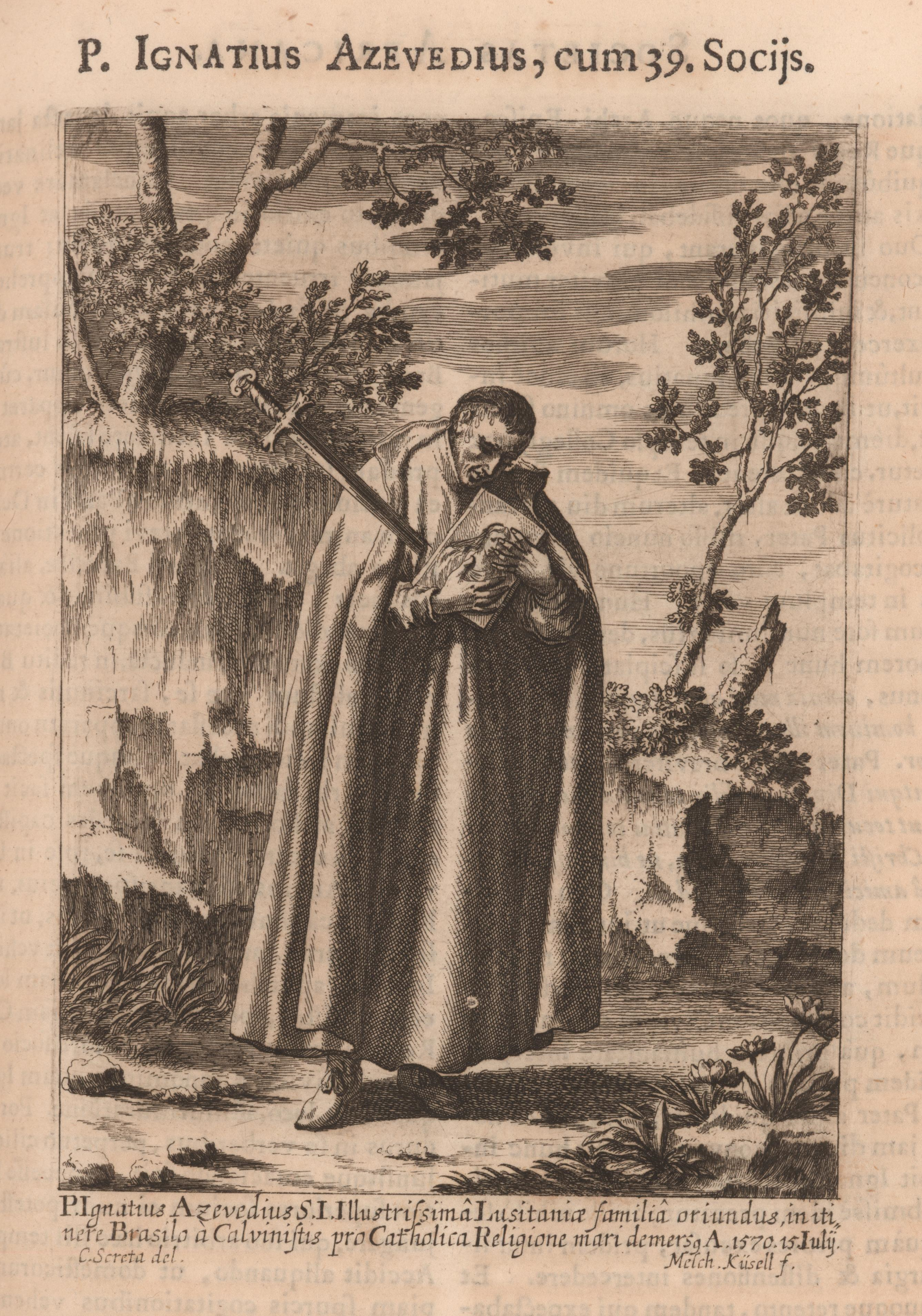

Martyr
- Born: 1526; Porto, Kingdom of Portugal
- Died: July 15, 1570 (aged 43–44); Atlantic Ocean, near the Canary islands
- Venerated in: Roman Catholic Church
- Beatified: 11 May 1854, Rome by Pope Pius IX
- Feast: 17 July

Inácio de Azevedo, SJ (1526–1570) was a Portuguese Jesuit missionary. He is one of the Forty Martyrs of Brazil, beatified by Pope Pius IX in 1854.

== Early life ==
He was born Inácio de Azevedo de Ataíde Abreu e Malafaia in the city of Porto, probably in the first quarter of the year 1526. His family was prominent in the Portuguese nobility of that era. His father, Dom Manuel de Azevedo, was heir to two ancient feudal properties in northern Portugal, the honras of Barbosa and Ataíde. His mother, Dona Francisca de Abreu, was a daughter of the celebrated Portuguese poet and navigator, João Gomes de Abreu, and Dona Filipa de Eça. And one of his younger brothers, Dom Jerónimo de Azevedo, was captain-general of Portuguese Ceylon and viceroy of Portuguese India.

He was an illegitimate son, legitimated by a Royal decree on July 22, 1539, as Dom Inácio de Ataíde (a surname of his grandmother - who was heiress of the honra of Ataíde - that he didn't use after joining the Jesuits) and educated at the Portuguese court of King John III. At the age of 18 he became administrator of his family's estate. However, after attending the sermons and speeches of Jesuit priest Francisco Estrada he chose to follow a religious career that would make him renounce his possessions, including his rights to the Feudal lordships of his father, in the northern Portuguese province of Entre Douro e Minho.

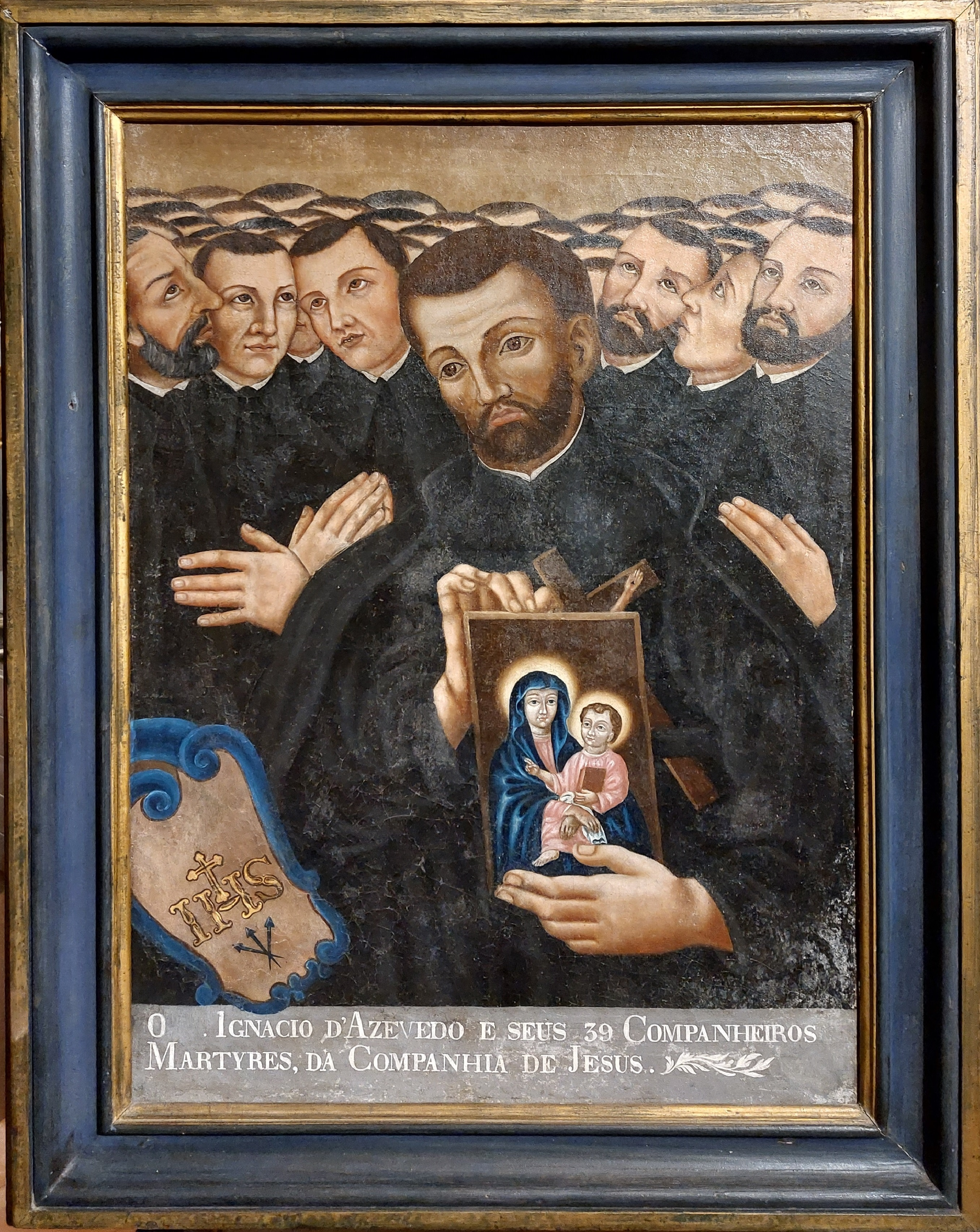
Inácio de Azevedo and companions in a 17th century Portuguese School painting at Pius XII Museum, Braga

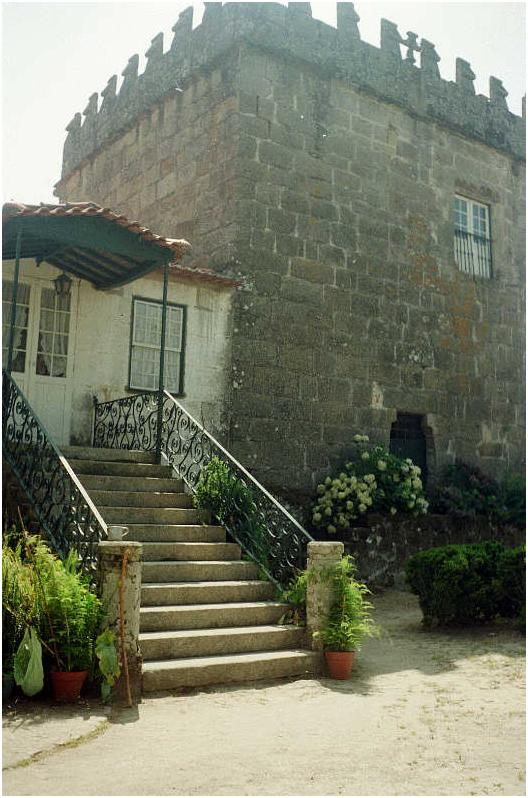
The manor house of the 12th century honra de Barbosa, in northern Portugal. Inácio de Azevedo was the presumptive heir to the lordship of the honra, but he renounced his rights to his father's estate when he became a Jesuit in 1548.

== Priesthood ==
In 1548 he entered the Society of Jesus where he was finally ordained in 1553. That same year he was nominated rector of the Jesuit college of Santo Antão, in Lisbon, an institution he would later endow with a sum of 600,000 reais. From the beginning of 1557 to February 1558 Azevedo was rector of the College of Arts in Coimbra and from 1560 to 1564 he was the dean of the Jesuit College of Saint Paul, in the city of Braga. On April 9, 1563, he made his four final vows of poverty, obedience, chastity, and special obedience to the Pope in Coimbra.

In the early 1560s, Azevedo was involved in the financing for the construction of the Roman College with the support of his father's fortune of 12,000 Portuguese cruzados. According to the Jesuit constitutions, Azevedo would have to renounce all the rights to his inheritance before taking the final vows. The Jesuit General, Francis Borgia, thus suggested that he postpone the vows until the death of his father, who was already 74 by the end of the 1550s in order for Azevedo to receive the full inheritance that the general hoped would be put towards the construction of the Roman College. Azvedo's father would not perish in that time frame, but left 1,500 cruzados to his son to support him. Of this sum, 900 cruzados would end up being dedicated to the Roman College.

In 1565 Francis Borgia nominated him Visitor to Brazil, with special powers for the inspection of the Jesuit missions in that Portuguese colony. He arrived in the then capital city of Salvador da Bahia in August 1566 and he proceeded to visit all the Jesuit missions in Brazil, as a passenger of the fleet that governor Mem de Sá sent to Rio de Janeiro with the aim of expelling the French from Guanabara Bay. Azevedo witnessed the final, successful Portuguese assault on the French garrison in Guanabara that took place on January 18, 1567. He then proceeded towards São Vicente, where he met the priest Manuel da Nóbrega; they agreed on the foundation of a new Jesuit college in Rio de Janeiro, an institution whose charter was signed in 1568, with Nóbrega as its first dean.

Accompanied by Nóbrega and José de Anchieta he then visited the missions in the cities of São Paulo and Rio de Janeiro whose foundations were being laid. Azevedo returned to Salvador in January 1568 and in August he boarded a ship headed to Portugal, thus completing his two-year stay in Brazil.

In October 1568 he was back in Lisbon and in May 1569 he proceeded to Rome to report to Pope Pius V and Francis Borgia. In his final report, Inácio de Azevedo asked for more people to be sent to the missions and Borgia duly gave him broad powers to recruit new elements for the Jesuits in Brazil. Then, after several months of intense preparations that included several meetings with King Sebastian of Portugal, Azevedo and his companions finally left Portugal for Brazil on the merchant vessel Santiago on 5 June 1570, while another group of more than 20 companions boarded the military fleet of the newly appointed Governor General of Brazil.

== Martyrdom ==
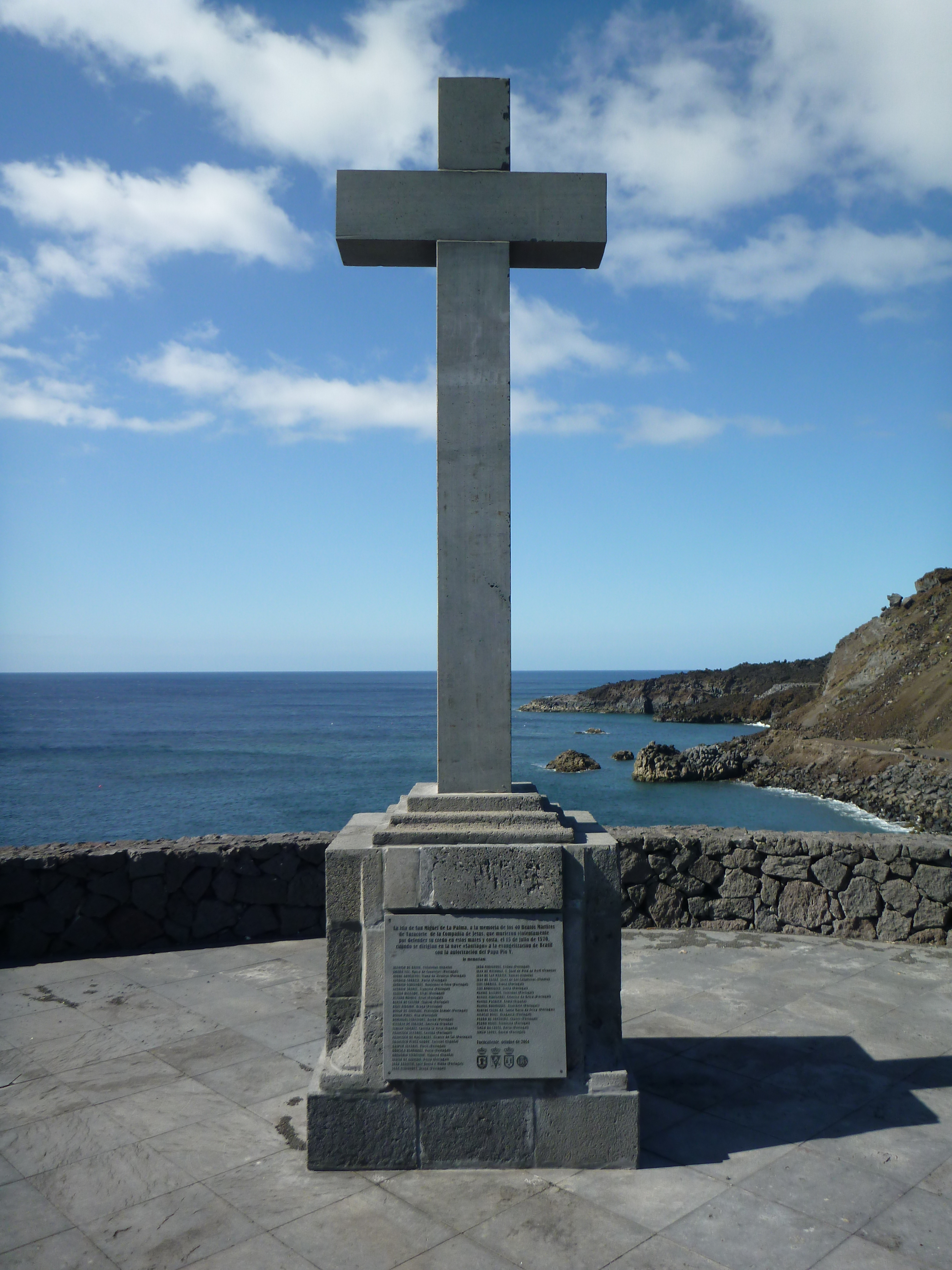
Monument to Inácio de Azevedo and his 39 companions (the Forty Martyrs of Brazil) at Fuencaliente Lighthouse in the island of La Palma, Canary Islands.

During the trip to Brazil, on July 15, 1570, while sailing near the Canary Islands, the Santiago was attacked and captured by a fleet led by the French Huguenot corsair Jacques de Sores off Fuencaliente Lighthouse. Following the capture of the Santiago, the attackers spared the lives of some members of the crew but Azevedo and his 39 companions were killed and their bodies thrown in the ocean.

== Veneration ==
The death of Inácio de Azevedo and his 39 companions on their voyage to Brazil at the hands of Calvinist corsairs was the biggest collective martyrdom of missionaries of the modern era and had great repercussion in the Europe of the time.

As early as 1571, on July 7, Pope Pius V honored the forty martyrs, referring to their "voluntary martyrdom" in the Brief Dum Indefese. According to tradition, St. Francis Borgia prayed daily to the forty martyrs, thus beginning a cult that would lead to their Beatification by Pope Pius IX on 11 May 1854.

== Legacy ==
Inácio's younger brother, Jerónimo de Azevedo, governor and captain-general of Portuguese Ceylon from 1594 to 1612, continued the work of Azvedo through his support of the Jusits in present-day Sri Lanka.

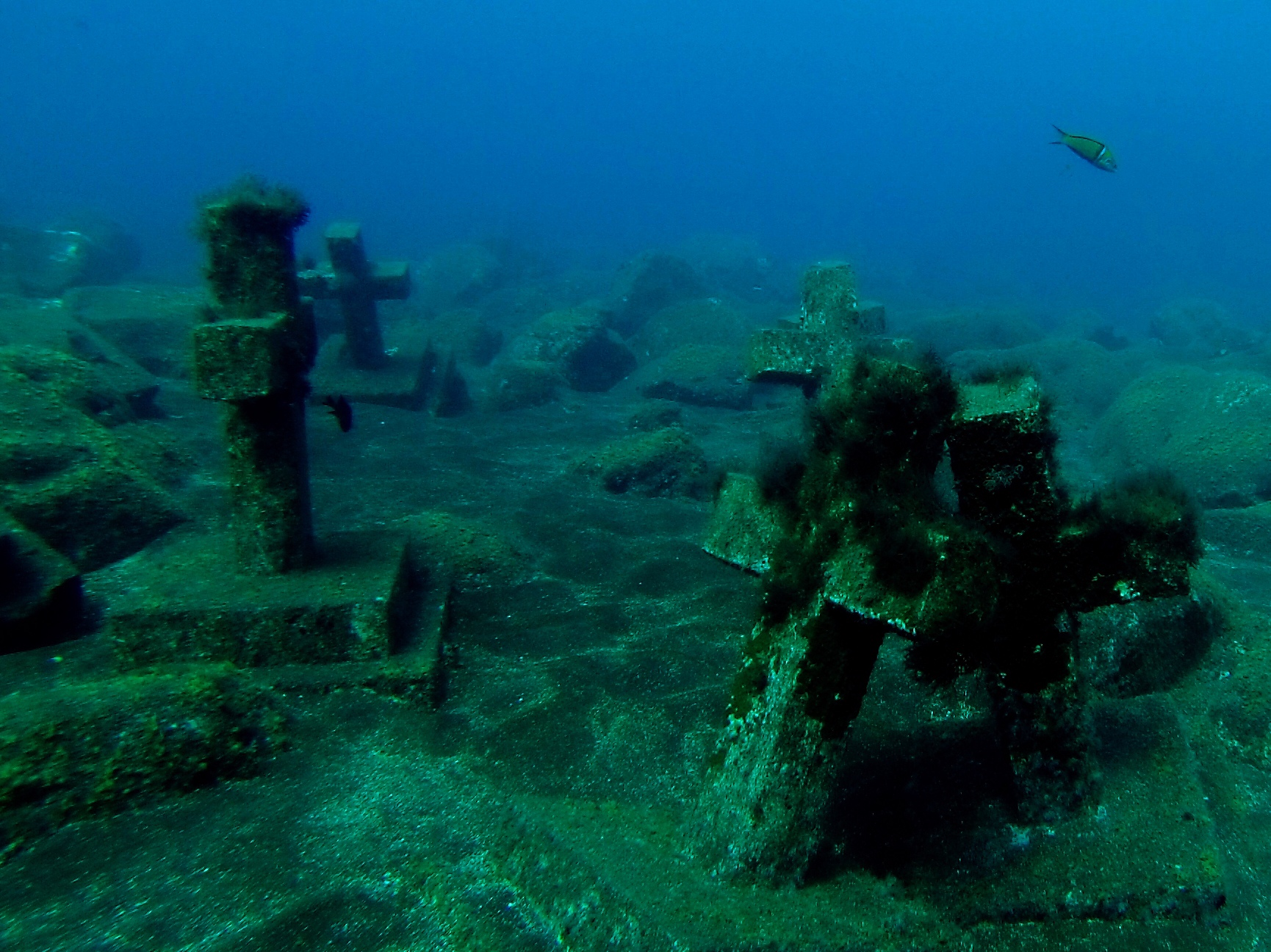
Underwater monument to the 40 martyrs of Brazil, off the island of La Palma

In 1999, forty concrete crosses at the place of martyrdom, about 200 meters off the Fuencaliente Lighthouse were placed on the seabed by the government of the island La Palma. This place is situated in a depth of about 20 meters and is today a popular diving destination.

Adjacent to the old tower, another monument for the Forty Martyrs of Brazil has been erected in October 2014. This monument is a stone cross, with a plate on which the names of the martyrs are engraved.
