= Vale de Madeiros =

- Village
- Interactive map of Vale de Madeiros
- Coordinates: 40°29′15″N 7°53′05″W
- Country: Portugal
- Region: Centro
- Sub-region: Dão-Lafões
- District: Viseu
- Municipality: Nelas
- Parish: Canas de Senhorim

Vale de Madeiros is a village located in the parish of Canas de Senhorim, municipality of Nelas, district of Viseu, sub-region of Dão-Lafões, region Centro, in Portugal.

== History ==
In the Kingdom's Population Registry (Cadastro da População do Reino, in Portuguese) from 1527, ordered by the King John III of Portugal, 171 houses (fogos, in 16th century Portuguese) were registered, 18 of those in the village (lugar, in 16th century Portuguese) of Vall de Madeyrus (Vale de Madeiros, in 16th century Portuguese).

== Cultural associations ==
- Rosas do Mondego Folklore Group

== Sports associations ==
- Sport Vale de Madeiros e Benfica (SVMB)

== Schools ==
- Nursery and primary school (ages up to 10): Escola Basica do 1.º Ciclo de Vale de Madeiros.

Against the will of local population and local authorities, the central government ordered its closure in the school year of 2014/2015 and thereafter.

== Sports Facilities ==
- Campo da Gatuna: Football Field of Vale de Madeiros, founded in 1975

== Heritage ==
- Penedo da Penha 1 and 2, Complex 1 and 2 of Shelters and Cavities, dated from the 3rd and 2nd millenniums BC, Neolithic, Chalcolithic and Bronze Age, located 1 km south of Vale de Madeiros, on the River Mondego Valley.
- Cross of Vale de Medeiros, located in Vale de Madeiros, Rua da Ladeira.
- Chapel of Saint Nicholas, Capela de São Nicolau, located in Vale de Madeiros, Rua Direita and Rua Chão de Monteiro, from 1732.
- Chapel of Saint John the Baptist, Capela de São João Baptista, located in Vale de Madeiros, Rua da Capela, from the 16th century.

== List of streets ==
- Beco da Ladeira
- Beco dos Chões
- Rua Chão do Monteiro
- Rua da Capela
- Rua da Carvalha
- Rua da Escola
- Rua da Ladeira
- Rua da Lage
- Rua da Lameira
- Rua da Urtigueira
- Rua das Contenças
- Rua de São José
- Rua Direita
- Rua do Campo de Futebol
- Rua do Pátio
- Rua dos Olivais
- Travessa da Escola
- Travessa das Contenças
- Travessa de São Nicolao
