= Pedro Gomes de Abreu, 3rd Lord of Regalados =

Portuguese nobleman

Pedro Gomes de Abreu
- Lord
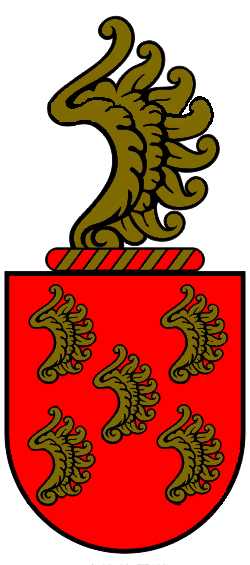
- Born: 14th-century Kingdom of Portugal
- Died: 15th-century Kingdom of Portugal

Pedro Gomes de Abreu (14th-century) was a Portuguese nobleman, Lord of Regalados and Valadares, Alcaide of Lapela.

== Biography ==
Pedro was the son of Diogo Gomes de Abreu and Leonor Viegas do Rego. His wife was Aldonça de Sousa descendant of Afonso III of Portugal and Marina Pires de Enxara.
