= Ferdinand of Portugal, Lord of Eça =

Ferdinand of Portugal
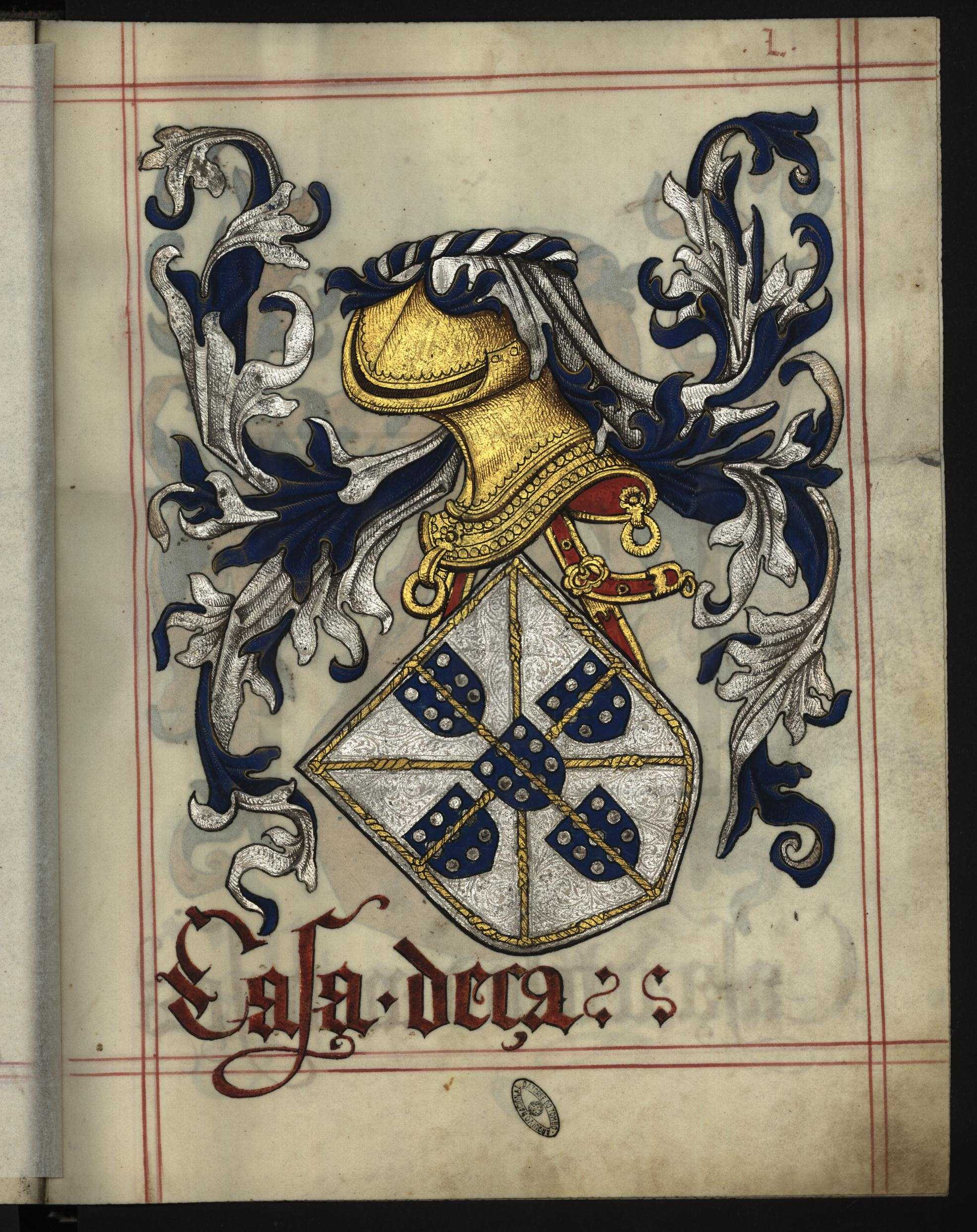
- Coat of arms of the Eça family, founded by Ferdinand of Portugal
- Born: 1378
- Died: 1460 (aged 81–82); Eça, Galicia
- Title: ' Lord of Eça '
- Spouse: Isabel Dávalos
- Parents: John, Duke of Valencia de Campos (father); Maria Tellez de Menezes (mother)

Ferdinand of Portugal (Portuguese: Fernando), later of Eça or Eza (1378 – 1460), was the son of Portuguese Infante John, Duke of Valencia de Campos. João, was a son of king Peter I of Portugal and Galician lady Inês de Castro, "the Queen who ruled after her death".

His father had been legitimized as Infant of Portugal, and became duke of Valencia de Campos in Castile through his marriage to one of the bastards of King Henry II of Castile.

Fernando's father John, had married in 1376, (1st marriage), Portuguese lady Maria Téllez de Menezes, assassinated shortly after in 1378 by her husband, who had been alerted of her apparent unfaithfulness.

== Life ==
He was the 1st Lord of Eza in Galicia, from where he took his surname, corrupted in Portuguese into Eça, and which was given to him by Fadrique de Castilla, 1st Duke of Arjona who died in prison.

== Marriages and issue ==
It is said Fernando was married to or perhaps lived with many wives, all of them alive. Other sources say he married six times, having three or four of them alive at once, but only the name of the sixth wife is known.

Apparently, this sixth one, was Isabel Dávalos, daughter of Pedro López Dávalos, Adelantado of Murcia, and granddaughter of Ruy López Dávalos, Constable of Castile. By her he had:

- Duarte de Eça (born c. 1415), a Clergyman, who had a son by his mistress, issue apparently extinct in male line.
- Pedro de Eça, 1st Alcaide-Mór of Moura, 2nd Lord of Aldeia Galega da Merceana (c. 1430–1492), who married Leonor Casca de Camões (born c. 1420), Heiress of Moura, and had issue, apparently extinct in male line, and also had issue (including Dona Filipa de Eça, Abbess of Lorvão Abbey and grandmother of Blessed Inácio de Azevedo) by unknown women, also apparently extinct in male line.
- Branca de Eça (born c. 1420), married firstly to Vasco Fernandes de Lucena (born c. 1420), by whom she had a daughter who became Abbess of the Monastery of Celas, in Coimbra, and married secondly to João Rodrigues de Azevedo, ?th Lord of Fonte de Louro (born c. 1410), and had issue.
- Inês de Eça (born c. 1450), married as his first wife to (Dom) Garcia de Sousa Chichorro (born c. 1450), and had one son.
- Catarina de Eça (born c. 1440, died aft. 1515), Perpetual Abbess of Lorvão Abbey, who had issue by Pedro Gomes de Abreu, 5th Lord of Regalados (born c. 1440).

With Leonor de Teive, daughter of João de Teive and Brites de Horta, he had:

- Fernando de Eça, 1st Alcaide-Mór of Vila Viçosa, in the service of the Duke of Braganza (c. 1410 – Barcelos, Martim, 15 August 1501 or bef. 1513), married to Joana de Saldanha (born c. 1410), and had issue, also had a son by an unknown wife, issue apparently extinct in male line.
- Garcia de Eça, 1st Alcaide-Mór of Muge (born c. 1410), married firstly to Joana de Albergaria (born c. 1410), and had issue, apparently extinct in male line, and married secondly as her first husband to Dona Catarina Coutinho (born c. 1440), without issue.
- Leonor de Eça (born c. 1410), married to Galiote Leitão, ?th Lord of Torre de Ota (born c. 1410), nobleman of the Royal Household, and had issue.

By another he had:

- Diogo de Eça (born c. 1410), married to Joana da Silva (born c. 1410), without issue.
- Brites de Eça (born c. 1415), Abbess of the Monastery of Celas, in Coimbra, who had issue by João Gomes de Abreu, Bishop of Viseu (c. 1410 – 16 February 1482).
- Maria de Eça, a nun at Saint Clare of Assisi in Porto.
- Inês de Eça (born c. 1415), married to Gonzalo Fernández de Hijar, 1st Lord of Valle del Jalón (c. 1410–1450), and had issue.
- Isabel de Eça (born c. 1415), married to Juan de Sotomayor (born c. 1410), and had one daughter.

By others:

- João de Eça (died at Tangiers), Commander of Cardiga in the Order of Christ.
- João de Eça (born c. 1420, died aft. 1475), married to Leonor Xira (born c. 1420), Aragonese, without issue. Had issue by unknown women, now extinct in male line.
- Diogo de Eça
- Antão de Eça, a monk.
- Brites de Eça, died unmarried.
- Catarina de Eça, a nun.

All from different women, it is said that he had 42 children, between sons and daughters.

== End of life ==
In the end of his life he repented and started wearing a rope of the Habit of Saint Francis of Assisi, with which he was buried and which appears in the coat of arms of his family in purple with the look of a carbuncule.
