= Gonçalo Martins de Abreu =

Anglo-Norman noble

- Knight
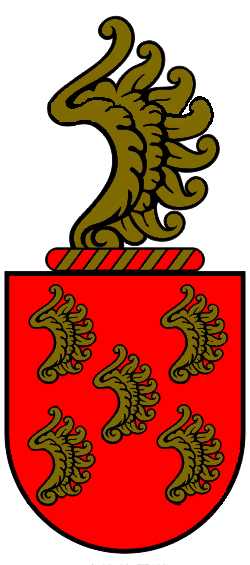
- Successor: Lourenço Gonçalves de Abreu
- Born: 11th-century Évreux, Upper Normandy, France
- Died: 12th-century Portugal
- Noble family: d'Évreux

Gonçalo Martins de Abreu or Geoffrey Devereux (11th century) was an Anglo-Norman Knight, who arrived in the Iberian Peninsula with Henry, Count of Portugal.

== Biography ==
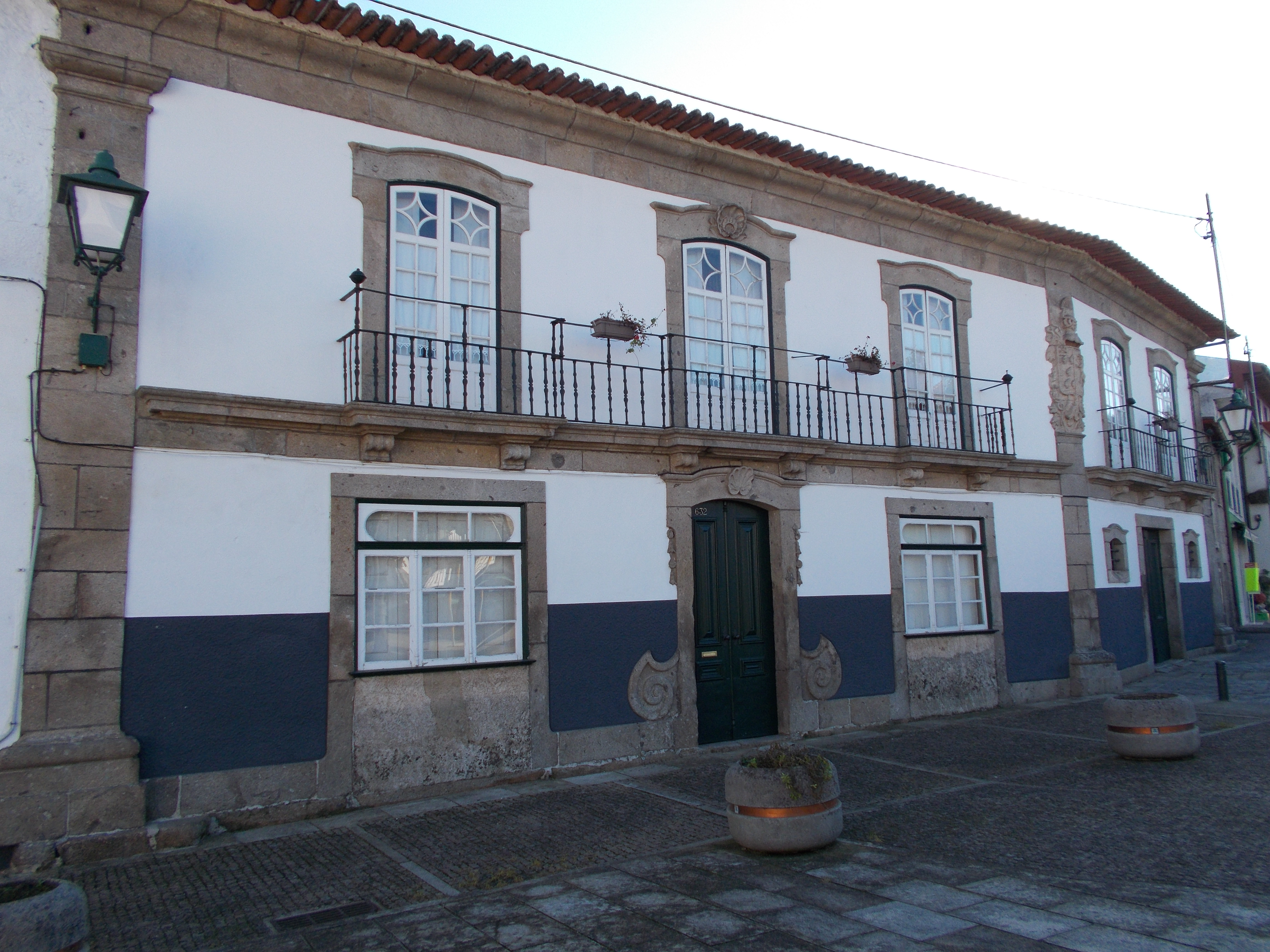
Abreu family mansion in Pico de Regalados

Gonçalo was the son of William d'Évreux by a second unnamed wife. He was the founder of the Abreu Family in Portugal. After establishing his residence in Galicia, Martins Évreux modified his surname to Abreu.
