= St Paul's Church, Braga =

Coordinates: 41.5485°N 8.42656°W

Igreja de S. Paulo-Braga

The Saint Paul Church in Portuguese, Igreja de São Paulo is a Portuguese 16th-century church in Braga, Portugal, dedicated to Saint Paul the Apostle of Jesus.

The church was built by the Jesuits for their College, in the time of the Archbishop Bartholomew of Braga, with a pure simple facade which is in contrast to its luxurious baroque interior with a magnificent wood carving work in the altars. It is currently integrated with the Seminar of Saint Peter and Saint Paul and with the Pius XII Museum.

== See also ==
- List of Jesuit sites
