= Castle of Moura =

Medieval castle in Moura, Beja, Portugal

- Castelo de Moura
- Beja, Baixo Alentejo, Alentejo in Portugal
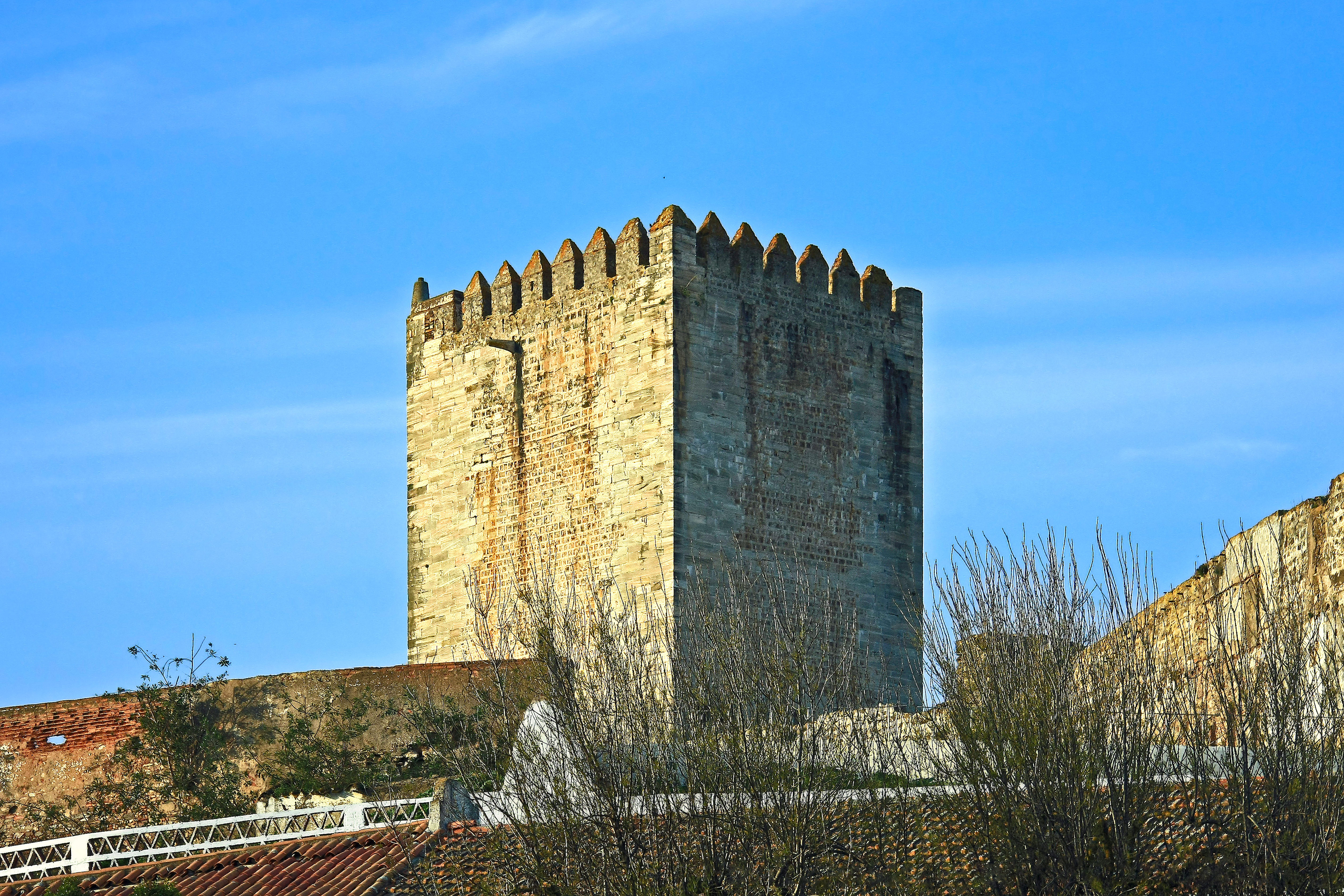

Site information
- Type: Castle
- Owner: Portuguese Republic
- Operator: Câmara Municipal de Moura, ceded 8 May 1959
- Open to the public: Public

Location
- Coordinates: 38°8′36.7″N 7°27′5.2″W

Site history
- Built: 11th century
- Materials: Stonework, Taipa

The Castle of Moura (Portuguese: Castelo de Moura) is a Portuguese medieval castle in civil parish of Moura (Santo Agostinho e São João Baptista) e Santo Amador, in the municipality of Moura, in the district of Beja.

== History ==
The construction of the Moorish walls began in the middle of the 11th century and lasted to 12th century, probably over a castro dating to the Iron Age settlement. The site successively occupied by the Romans, the Visigoths and Muslims, who turned the town into the capital of the Al-Manijah province.

In 1166, as legend relates, the princess Salúquia, daughter of Abu-Hassan and governor of the city, fell in love with Bráfama, the Moorish mayor of Aroche. On the eve of their marriage, Brfafama went with a party to Al-Manijah, ten leagues away. But the entire Alentejo territory to the north and west had already been conquered by the Christians and the journey proved dangerous. Pedro Rodrigues and his brother, being aware of the wedding preparations that were taking there, ambushed Brfafam's party in an olive grove near the limits of the village and easily defeated and killed. The Christians then disguised themselves in the robes of their Muslim foes and headed for the town. Meanwhile, Salúquia was at the top of the castle tower, where she awaited the arrival of her fiancé. Seeing that a group of seemingly Islamic knights were approaching, the princess believed them to be Aroche's entourage, and allowed them to cross the fortification gates. But as soon as they entered, the Christians threw themselves upon the defenders of the city. Taken by surprise, the Muslim forces were defeated. Realizing her error and wounded by the certainty of Brafama's death, she took the keys of the town and rushed from the tower. Moved by the love story that the Islamic survivors told them, the Rodrigues brothers renamed the town Terra da Moura Salúquia, but over time the name would devolve to Terra da Moura, later Moura. A mud-brick tower (taipa) within the Castle of Moura is still referred to as Salúquia Tower, and an olive grove in the vicinity of Moura, where Brfafama and his entourage were ambushed, the people call Brfafama de Aroche. Moura's coat-of-arms would eventually incorporate figure of a dead Moor, with the tower in the background, alluding to the legend of Moor Salúquia.

A foral (charter) was issued by King D. Afonso I, later confirmed in 1217 by his successor, D. Afonso II, during a seesaw period when the region oscillated between Portugal and the Moors. In 1295, Moura became a definitive part of the Kingdom under the reign of King D. Dinis, and a new foral issue in 1295, followed by a similar foral issued to the Moor community. At the beginning of the 14th century, the castle incorporated the Moorish fortifications.

In 1320, a third of the land rents from churches in Serpa and Moura were donated by the Order of Aviz for the reconstruction and maintenance of the castles. New reforms were carried out in the second half of the century by order of D. Fernando, when the growth of the village demanded the extension of its borders and a second line of walls were necessary. A second series of fortifications were begun in the second half of the 14th century, under the initiative of D. Fernando.

Between the 15th- and 16th-century there were several alterations, under the direction of Francisco de Arruda, that included the construction of the wall separating the dungeon and the Salúquia and clock towers. Designs by Duart de Armas, represent the castle as an irregular plan, that includes castle with barbican connected to the town wall. A new foral was issued in 1512, by King D. Manuel I. At the same time, Dominicana nuns decided to building within the walls, in 1562, a convent within the castle walls, under the direction of D. Ângela de Moura, taking advantage of the foundations of the mosque.

The medieval fortress was reinforced in 1655, during the Restoration Wars, with the construction of a line of walls and defended by bastions, by Nicolau de Langres, under the initiative of King D. John IV.

The walls of the fortress were dynamited in 1707, following the withdrawal of the Duke of Ossuna, during the Succession Wars. It was further damaged in 1755, following the Lisbon earthquake. These events marked a period of decline for the castle and fortifications, as in the proceeding years the taipa material were removed from the walls and reused. In 1850, the western wall of the dungeon was demolished by José Pimenta Calça, in order to construct the lagar of Vista Alegre. By 1875, the convent was finally abandoned.

But, sometime in the 19th century, the clock tower was constructed. Work on recuperating the site began in 1959 with consolidation of the towers and walls, followed by successive years of work on other portions of the wall fortifications: in 1964, along the north wall; between 1968 and 1970, consolidation of the walls; and 1971, repairs to the dungeon. Also, the church was reconstructed in 1972, but reworked in 1977, in addition to the recuperation of the area near the former-convent. Archaeological excavations by Jorge Pinho Monteiro were executed in 1981.

On 8 March 2002, a public tender was announced in the Diário da República (issue 57), for the adjudication contract to improve the castle landscape. This move resulted in further classification attempts, such as the 2005 proposal to classify the modern fortification, by the local authority. This was complimented on 31 January 2006, by the opening of a process by IPPAR/DRÉvora on 11 January. A special protection zone for each of the walls was established on 30 November 2010 by the DRCAlentejo. These proposals were prorogued on 30 December 2010, following discoveries onsite. In 2011, archaeological excavations realized during construction of the tourist reception buildings discovered funerary tombs from the Roman period (specifically the 1st century), as well as the some buildings.

== Architecture ==
The castle is erected on an elevated hilltop in the northeastern edge of the town, approximately 184 metres (604 ft) above sea level, at the confluence of the Rio Ardila, the ravines of Brenhas and Lavandeira. Within the barbican is the Dominican convent, near the entrance to the dungeon, with its church oriented to the principal facade.

The castle consists of an oval plan, 200 by 120 metres (660 ft × 390 ft) maximum dimensions, occupying the alcazaba in the southwest. It is separate from the rest of the spaces by a line walls, reinforced in the middle by a rectangular keep tower, flanked by a minor tower and by a semi-circular corbel along the wall to the north. The keep tower and circular corbel of the alcazaba includes prismatic merlons with pyramids. Meanwhile, the keep tower has a vaulted first floor ceiling with ribbed ogival, supported by 8 slender columns, known as the Sala dos Alcaides (Alcalde's room). It is crossed by a corridor connected that connects it to the Chemin de ronde and the terrace. On the wall to the alcazaba are vestiges of square towers. Along the circus are still part segments of the walls of the northern barbican, trapezoidal tower, a clock-tower and two circular towers with rear chamfers: the tower of Selúquia (in the northeast) clocktower (in the southeast).

The semi-destroyed tower of Selúquia, with posterior wall includes an archway with access that accompanies terrace. The clocktower is covered by a battlement covered in prismatic merlons, with a square tower, and crossed by a corridor that provides access to the terrace. Most of the walls are still vertical and include chemin de ronde without merlons. Of the gates and doors situated along the wall: the Alcazaba door, that separates the circus from the castle, between the keep and minor tower; the main gate, in the southeast, broken by arch over posts, inscribed in alfiz, that provides access to an elbow corridor that passes under the library building; and a small door, in the northwest along the wall.

=== Convent ===
The Church and Convent of São Domingos comprises a rectangular church with addorsed chapel (on the south), surrounded by various rectangular dependencies associated with the convent (in the north and east) and belltower (in the north). The principal facade with gable is topped by windings, includes two rectangular spans and 3 arches with access to the galilee, covered by vaults ceiling over corbels. In the southern lateral facade is a counter-curved doorway. The ruined door to the convent along the presbytery is distinguished by a coat-of-arms carved into the tympanum.

The unique nave is covered in tile with a high-choir over the galilee and part of the nave. On the epistle side is a lateral chapel with a Manueline tomb that hosts the two brothers, Pedro and Álvaro Rodrigues, the two alleged strategists that conquered the village in 1166. The main altar is covered with a vaulted ceiling open to the nave by rounded triumphal arch over pilasters.
