= Comenda =

Portuguese award

In Portugal, a comenda is a benefit that was granted to knights in military orders, but now describes a purely honorary distinction. In the past, comenda could be a piece of land given as a reward for services, together with the duty to defend it from enemies and criminals. The holder of a comenda is called a comendador (commander) in Portuguese.

== See also ==
- Honorific orders of Portugal
