= Nelas =

- Municipality
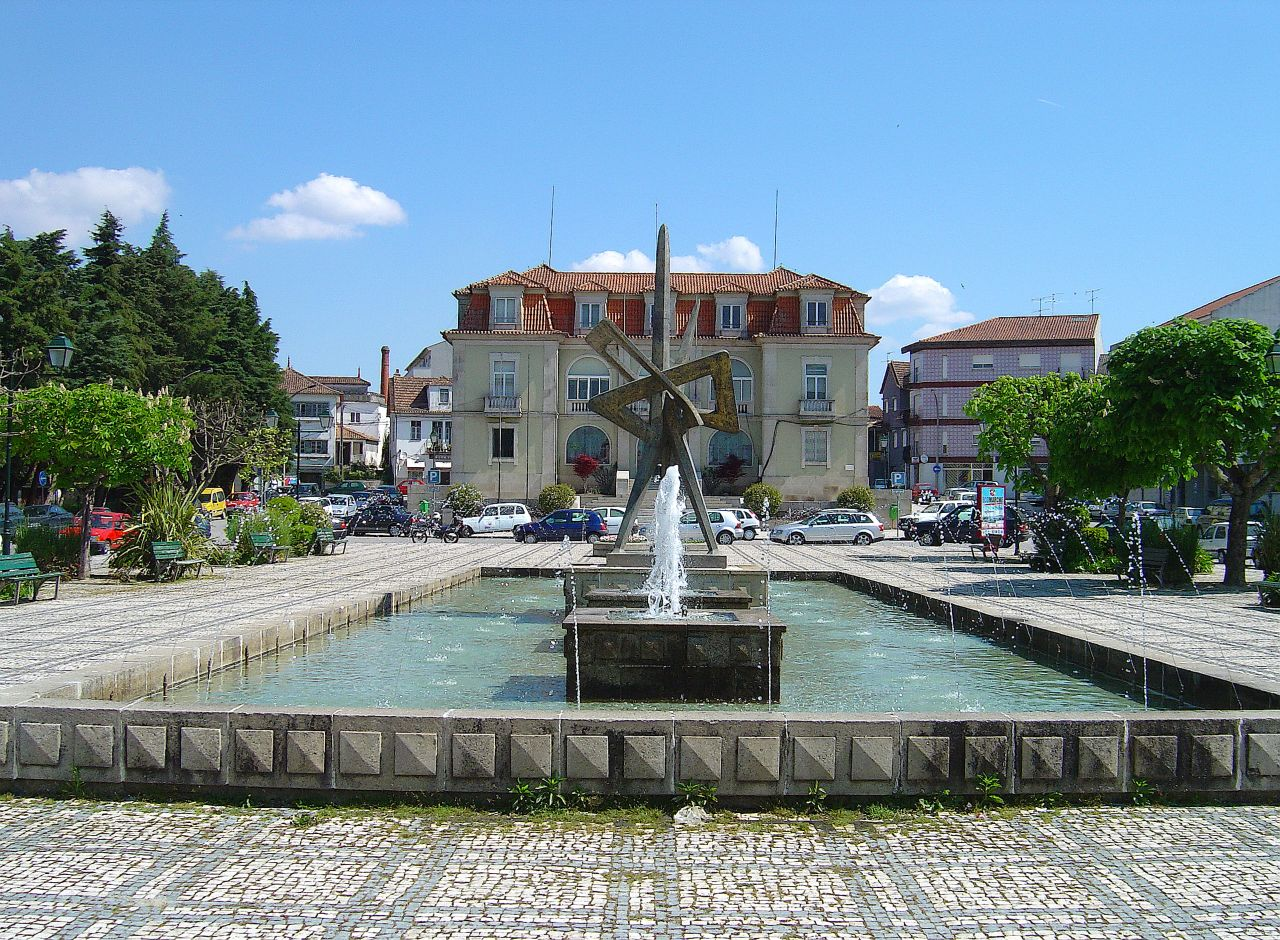
- The public water fountain in the Praça do Município across from the Câmara Municipal de Nelas

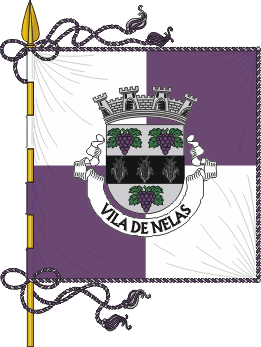
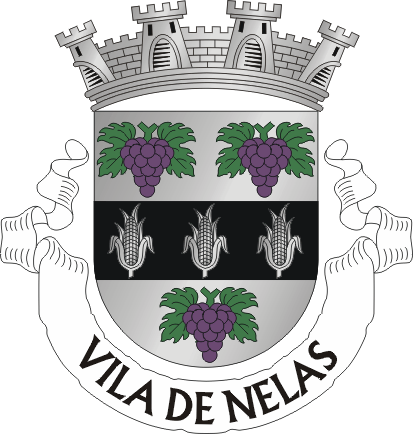
- Flag Coat of arms
- Interactive map of Nelas
- Coordinates: 40°31′N 7°51′W
- Country: Portugal
- Region: Centro
- Intermunic. comm.: Viseu Dão Lafões
- District: Viseu
- Parishes: 7

Government
  - President: José Borges da Silva (PS)

Area
  - Total: 125.71 km^{2} (48.54 sq mi)
- Highest elevation: 483 m (1,585 ft)
- Lowest elevation: 150 m (490 ft)

Population (2011)
  - Total: 14,037
  - Density: 111.66/km^{2} (289.20/sq mi)
- Time zone: UTC+00:00 (WET)
  - Summer (DST): UTC+01:00 (WEST)
- Postal code: 3520
- Area code: 232
- Patron: São João Baptista
- Website: www.cm-nelas.pt

Nelas (Portuguese pronunciation: [ˈnɛlɐʃ]) is a municipality located in the Centro Region of continental Portugal. The population in 2011 was 14,037, in an area of 125.71 km².

== History ==
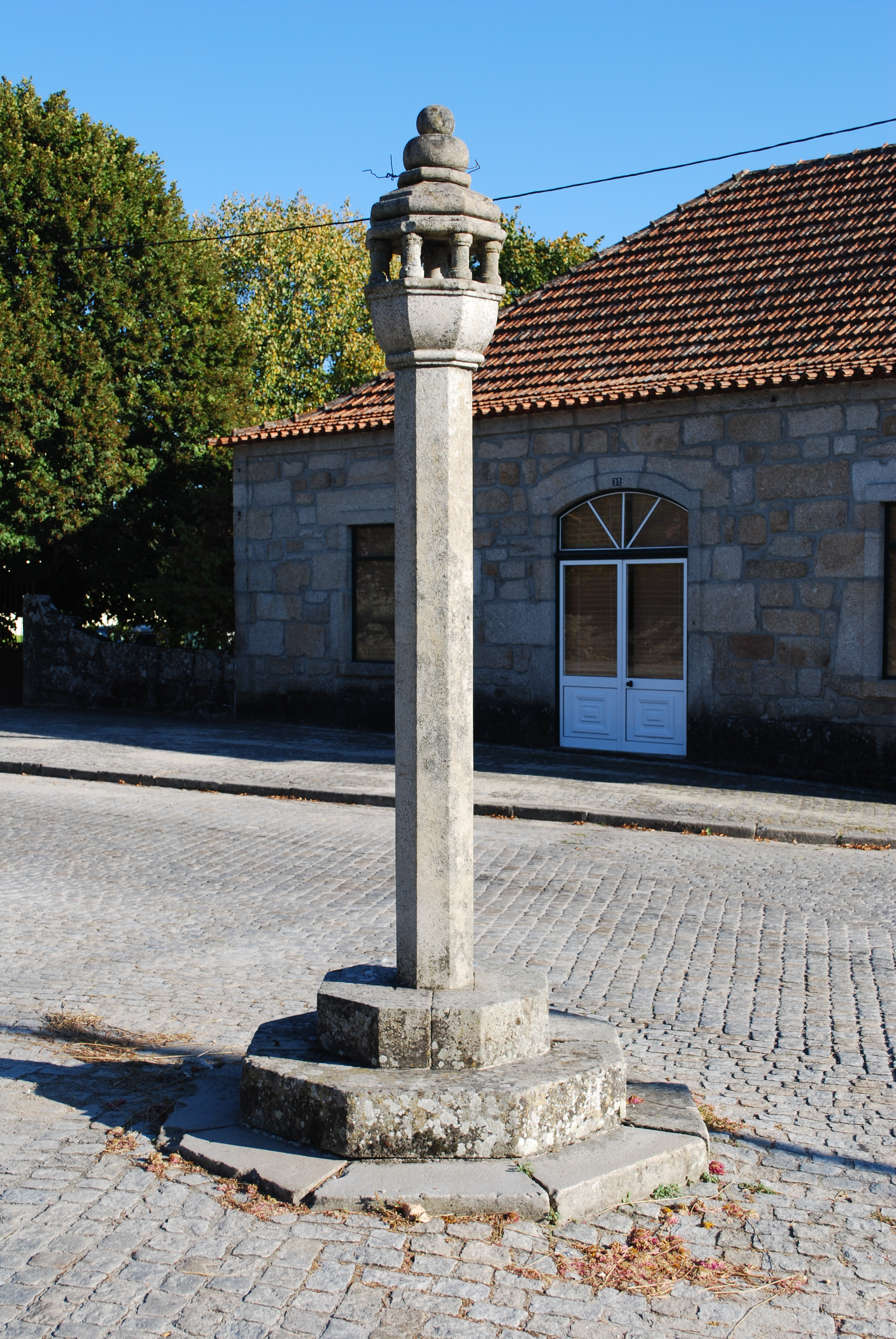
The pillory of Vilar Seco, marking the early creation of local authority within the parishes of Nelas

Settlement of the territory of Nelas dates back to the settlement by Neolithic and Stone age cultures, between 5000 and 3000 BC. Many of the structures that developed in this period were stone slabs and large rocks, and included megalithic monuments such as the Orca Pramelas, in Canas de Senhorim, and Outeiro Roque, near the village Lapa do Lobo.

Roman settlements also intersected this territory, with the construction of roads (such as those still visible in Santar and Vilar Seco).

Remnants of Middle Age influences can be since on the gravestone in Pedras da Forca.

The municipality of Nelas was created on 9 December 1852, during the politico-administrative reforms following the Liberal Revolution, that rationalized the chaotic local administration, and merged the two older municipalities of Senhorim with Canas de Senhorim. By Decree, Queen Maria II of Portugal and the Queen's Minister Rodrigo da Fonseca Magalhães, created the municipality of Nelas.

The municipality advanced due to its privileged geographic situation, at the junction of several roadways connecting Viseu to the Serra da Estrela mountain range, and the railway that also crossed the mountains. This position allowed the municipality to become the major industrial centre of the district of Viseu during the 20th century.

== Geography ==
Situated within the Centro region, the municipality is located on the Beirão plateau, surrounded in the south and east by the Serra da Estrela, the Serra Açor, and the Serra da Lousã mountain ranges; to the west the Serra do Bussaco, Serra do Caramulo, Serra da Freita and Serra do Montemurro. To the southwest is the right margin of the Mondego River, while to the northwest is the left bank of the Dão River. The accented topography of approximately 124.57 square kilometres (48.10 mi^{2}) ranges from 256 to 467 metres (840 to 1,532 ft) above sea level.

=== Ecoregions/Protected areas ===
In Vilar Seco, just off the Estrada Nacional E.N.234, between Nelas and Mangualde, is the Parque Ecológico of Quinta da Cerca (Ecological Park of Quinta do Cerca).

=== Human geography ===
The population of 14037 residents is proportionally divided between the sexes, with 47.57% male and 52.43% female residents. This distribution is also portioned between various age cohorts, with the 25-64 age group the dominant; these groups include: preschool age (0–4 years), 1925 residents; school age (15–24 years), 1324 residents; adults (25-64), 7308 residents; and seniors (age 65 and older, that comprises 3465 residents. The average size of a family in this community is approximately 2.6 persons per household.

Educationally, the residents of the municipality primarily achieve primary-secondary school equivalency (8335 residents), with 2896 defined as "drop-outs" inhabitants. Residents achieving a college- or university-level degrees including 1676 and 1130 residents, respectively.

Growth in urban households as developed since 1991, with the addition of 1935 buildings into the stock.

Administratively, the municipality is divided into 7 civil parishes (freguesias):

- Canas de Senhorim, with an area of 25.45 square kilometres (9.83 mi^{2}), is a parish since 1928, and includes the localities of parish seat of Canas de Senhorim, in addition to the villages of Caldas da Felgueira, Póvoa de Santo António, Urgeiriça, and Vale de Madeiros;
- Carvalhal Redondo e Aguiera, established in 2013, area 13.52 square kilometres (5.22 mi^{2});
- Lapa do Lobo, founded in 1985, area 7.32 square kilometres (2.83 mi^{2});
- Nelas, the municipal seat, area 21.63 square kilometres (8.35 mi^{2}), and consists of the town of Nelas, as well as the villages of Algeraz, Caldas da Felgueira, Folhadal and Póvoa de Roçada;
- Santar e Moreira, established in 2013, area 16.30 square kilometres (6.29 mi^{2});
- Senhorim, area 31.34 square kilometres (12.10 mi^{2}), it is the largest parish in the municipality, encompassing the small town of Senhorim, as well as the villages of Carvalhas, Vila Ruiva, Póvoa de Cima, São João do Monte and Póvoa de Luzianes;
- Vilar Seco is a civil parish of approximately 10.15 square kilometres (3.92 mi^{2}).

With a local population of 4702 residents, the urban town of Nelas consists of an area of 21.47 square kilometres (8.29 mi^{2}), situated on the Beirão plateau, opposite the Serra do Caramulo. It is 22 kilometres (14 mi) from Viseu, 77 kilometres (48 mi) from Coimbra, 133 kilometres (83 mi) from Porto and 280 kilometres (170 mi), with daily connections by road and rail-lines.

Central to this centre is the Praça do Município where many of the local services are concentrated, including: municipal offices, local parish services, the district judiciary courts building, detachment of the Guarda Nacional Republicana, a multi-purpose building, BMS multi-service centre and GAE emigrant support office. Meanwhile, other structures and services in the area include: the Health Center (located along Avenida João XXIII); the CTT Post Office (on Rua Luis de Camões), the municipal stadium, the António Lobo Antunes Library (located on Avenida Dr. Francisco de Sá Carneiro, the Sports Pavilion and the Municipal swimming pool (located on Avenida Dr. Francisco de Sá Carneiro), and the detachment of the local voluntary firehouse (located on Rua António Lobo Antunes). In addition, the urban landscape includes there are three industrial zones, with several large and medium-sized enterprises, as well as various shops and department stores.

=== Climate ===
Nelas has a Mediterranean climate (Köppen: Csb/Csa) with cool to mild, rainy winters and warm to hot, dry summers.

== Climate ==
Climate data for Nelas, 1991–2020 normals and extremes
Month	Jan	Feb	Mar	Apr	May	Jun	Jul	Aug	Sep	Oct	Nov	Dec	Year
Record high °C (°F)	19.3 (66.7)	23.8 (74.8)	28.3 (82.9)	30.0 (86.0)	35.4 (95.7)	40.0 (104.0)	40.6 (105.1)	41.9 (107.4)	40.8 (105.4)	33.6 (92.5)	25.2 (77.4)	21.0 (69.8)	41.9 (107.4)
Mean daily maximum °C (°F)	12.2 (54.0)	13.9 (57.0)	17.0 (62.6)	18.7 (65.7)	22.3 (72.1)	26.5 (79.7)	30.1 (86.2)	30.3 (86.5)	26.7 (80.1)	21.1 (70.0)	15.4 (59.7)	12.9 (55.2)	20.6 (69.1)
Daily mean °C (°F)	7.9 (46.2)	9.0 (48.2)	11.7 (53.1)	13.2 (55.8)	16.3 (61.3)	19.6 (67.3)	22.3 (72.1)	22.6 (72.7)	19.9 (67.8)	15.8 (60.4)	11.1 (52.0)	8.7 (47.7)	14.8 (58.6)
Mean daily minimum °C (°F)	3.7 (38.7)	4.1 (39.4)	6.3 (43.3)	7.7 (45.9)	10.3 (50.5)	12.7 (54.9)	14.6 (58.3)	14.8 (58.6)	13.1 (55.6)	10.4 (50.7)	6.7 (44.1)	4.4 (39.9)	9.1 (48.4)
Record low °C (°F)	−4.2 (24.4)	−3.1 (26.4)	−5.5 (22.1)	−0.1 (31.8)	1.9 (35.4)	5.0 (41.0)	6.0 (42.8)	8.0 (46.4)	4.0 (39.2)	−0.2 (31.6)	−3.0 (26.6)	−4.3 (24.3)	−5.5 (22.1)
Average precipitation mm (inches)	140.2 (5.52)	94.3 (3.71)	89.8 (3.54)	98.3 (3.87)	73.3 (2.89)	28.8 (1.13)	11.2 (0.44)	19.9 (0.78)	51.5 (2.03)	128.3 (5.05)	128.9 (5.07)	134.4 (5.29)	998.9 (39.33)
Average precipitation days (≥ 1 mm)	10.9	8.3	8.7	10.6	8.9	4.0	1.9	2.5	5.2	10.4	11.0	11.0	93.5
Source: Instituto Português do Mar e da Atmosfera

Climate data for Nelas, 1971-2000 normals and extremes, altitude: 440 m (1,440 ft)
Month	Jan	Feb	Mar	Apr	May	Jun	Jul	Aug	Sep	Oct	Nov	Dec	Year
Record high °C (°F)	20.0 (68.0)	22.0 (71.6)	27.0 (80.6)	30.0 (86.0)	33.6 (92.5)	38.9 (102.0)	40.0 (104.0)	40.4 (104.7)	39.0 (102.2)	31.3 (88.3)	25.6 (78.1)	24.0 (75.2)	40.4 (104.7)
Mean daily maximum °C (°F)	11.9 (53.4)	13.5 (56.3)	16.2 (61.2)	17.4 (63.3)	20.3 (68.5)	25.2 (77.4)	28.8 (83.8)	29.1 (84.4)	26.2 (79.2)	20.3 (68.5)	15.7 (60.3)	12.8 (55.0)	19.8 (67.6)
Daily mean °C (°F)	7.4 (45.3)	8.8 (47.8)	10.8 (51.4)	12.0 (53.6)	14.7 (58.5)	18.6 (65.5)	21.4 (70.5)	21.4 (70.5)	19.2 (66.6)	14.7 (58.5)	10.8 (51.4)	8.5 (47.3)	14.0 (57.2)
Mean daily minimum °C (°F)	2.9 (37.2)	4.1 (39.4)	5.4 (41.7)	6.7 (44.1)	9.1 (48.4)	12.1 (53.8)	13.9 (57.0)	13.7 (56.7)	12.1 (53.8)	9.1 (48.4)	5.9 (42.6)	4.2 (39.6)	8.3 (46.9)
Record low °C (°F)	−6.0 (21.2)	−6.0 (21.2)	−5.5 (22.1)	−3.0 (26.6)	0.5 (32.9)	3.5 (38.3)	6.0 (42.8)	5.0 (41.0)	3.8 (38.8)	−1.7 (28.9)	−3.0 (26.6)	−3.5 (25.7)	−6.0 (21.2)
Average rainfall mm (inches)	132.5 (5.22)	114.5 (4.51)	68.5 (2.70)	96.1 (3.78)	83.6 (3.29)	49.0 (1.93)	17.2 (0.68)	15.2 (0.60)	50.4 (1.98)	104.0 (4.09)	113.0 (4.45)	154.3 (6.07)	998.3 (39.3)
Average precipitation days (≥ 0.1 mm)	13.5	11.1	10.6	12.3	11.2	6.9	3.5	3.2	6.5	11.5	11.4	12.5	114.2
Source: Instituto de Meteorologia

== Economy ==
Agriculture has been the predominant local activity in this region since the first settlement of the territory, and now includes cultivation of vineyards, orchards, olive fields and pine forests (for pine nuts). Nelas, also belongs to two important gastronomically defined regions in Portugal:

- Dão DOC Wine Region, a defined mark supported by Nelas' history, its wine routes and annual wine exhibitions. The Dão wine, although purchased in shops and department stores, is sold by Vinícola de Nelas, Lda. (along Avenida da Liberdade), the winery and cellar of Carvalhão Torto, or warehouse of José Marques Loureiro.;
- Serra da Estrela DOP Cheese, the DOP Demoninação de Origem Protegida (Protected Origin Denomination) was applied to the artisanal cheeses of this territory, which are sold directly by the producers to their clients (in addition to shops and supermarkets throughout the country) or exported.

Since the early 20th century, the region has become more industrialized, due to entrepreneurial innovation local labour force. The small town of Caldas da Felgueira for example, located approximately 5 kilometres (3.1 mi) from the town centre, is known for the medicinal hot springs, that began treating illness and disease since the 19th century. This area was expanded and incorporated into a modern spa, that includes beauty treatments, but also the sale of the thermal waters.

=== Tourism ===
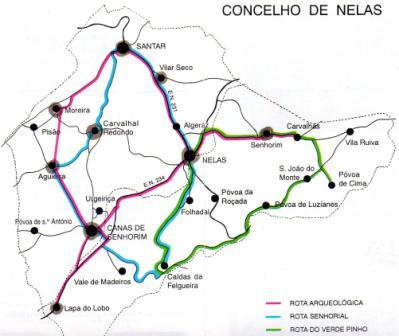
Tourist itineraries within the municipality of Nelas

Nelas falls within the Turismo do Centro association, that promotes the area's archaeological, historical and religious architecture, that includes its pillories, the places of worship, fountains and mills. There are three different routes with the following itinerary:

- Archaeological Route (Portuguese: Rota Arqueloógica), which begins in the town of Nelas, to the small town of Canas de Senhorim, then the villages of Lapa do Lobo, Aguieira, Moreira, Santar, Vilar Seco, Senhorim, and Carvalhas.
- Signeurial Route (Portuguese: Rota Senhorial), a tour of the many manors, mansions and estates that exist within the municipality, identifying the historical landscape of the municipality; from Nelas (at the manor and chapel of the family of José Tavares), the traveller passes through Folhadal (pillory), Caldas da Felgueira (Chapel of São Nicolau), Canas de Senhorim (estate of Abreu Madeira, the Church of Nossa Senhora da Conceição, Chapel of Nossa Senhora da Conceição and the pillory), Aguieira (estate of the Sacadura Botte family and the pillory), Carvalhal Redondo (the Chapel and the pillory), Santar (manorhours of the Count of Santar, estate of Soito, Residence of the Fidalgas, Manorhouse of the Borges da Gama, and churches), Vilar Seco (Manor of the Count of Vilar Seco, Manor of the Count of Prime, Mansion of the family of Queiroz de Albuquerque, the church and the pillory);
- Green Pine Route (Portuguese: Rota do Pinho Verde), from Nelas to Folhadal, is a scenic landscape that includes stops in the villages of Senhorim, Carvalhas, Póvoa de Cima, São João do Monte, Póvoa de Luzianes and Caldas da Felgueira.

== Culture ==
Fairs, festivals, and local markets occur throughout the year, but the primary local and tourist-oriented events. Monthly markets are held on Saturdays, with the primary attractants occurring: on the first Saturday of the month in Canas de Senhorim; the second Saturday of the month in Nelas; the third Saturday of the month in Carvalhal Redondo, and on the last Saturday of the month in Santar.

Religious celebrations within the municipality vary owing to different patrons saints, but the more popular include celebrations during Holy Week, including the Tuesday of Easter, during the feast day of Nossa Senhora da Tosse, in Folhadal; on 15 August, the feast day of Nossa Senhora do Viso, in Carvalhal Redondo; and the feast day of Santa Eufémia, in Santar, on 16 September; as well as the feast of São Silvestre on the last day of the year.

Meanwhile, secular celebrations also bring activities to the streets of the municipality, with the festival of Nelas on the 24 June; the river festival of Moreira at the beginning of July; the August folklore festival in Vale de Madeiros; and the Dão Wine festival and fair, on the first weekend of September.

The Fundação Lapa do Lobo, located along Rua de Santa Catarina in Lapa do Lobo, is an entity that strives to promote the culture of the municipality, through cultural activities, such as art exhibitions, a public free-of-charge library and an auditorium for public events.

== Architecture ==
The following section, although not exhaustive, provides a reference of the major nationally classified monuments that exist in the municipality.

=== Archaeologic ===
- Dolmen of Pramelas (Portuguese: Orca de Pramelas)

=== Civic ===
Originating from the laws of the Romans, the territory of Nelas is dotted by pillories that marked local authority, and constructed in settlements to promote development. Later, during the Portuguese monarchy, the pillories were used for public punishment; those responsible for fraud or robbery were executed or punished while tied to the pillories. Many were later destroyed or neglected following the Liberal Revolution of 1820.

- Pillory of Aguieira (Portuguese: Pelourinho de Aguieira), located in the Largo do Pelourinho, the structure was originally constructed in 1540, but in 1937 was reconstructed from the remains of a primitive pillory;
- Pillory of Canas de Senhorim (Portuguese: Pelourinho de Canas de Senhorim), this new (20th century) pillory was constructed to mark the ancient structure constructed in 1154, establishing the creation of the municipality of Senhorim. It was actually a 1987 reconstruction of one rebuilt in 1935, that was demolished following a road accident;
- Pillory of Casal Sancho (Portuguese: Pelourinho de Casal Sancho)
- Pillory of Folhadal (Portuguese: Pelourinho de Folhadal), the 17th-century structure is one of the oldest in the municipality, located in the locality of Folhadal;
- Pillory of Nelas (Portuguese: Pelourinho de Nelas), rebuilt in 1935, it this pillory, located in the Largo Miguel Bombarda was restored to commemorate its early prototype, whose date of founding is unclear;
- Pillory of Senhorim (Portuguese: Pelourinho de Senhorim/Cruzeiro de Senhorim), the 17th century structure is one of the oldest in the municipality, located in the locality of Folhadal;
- Pillory of Vilar Seco (Portuguese: Pelourinho de Vilar Seco), another pillory reconstructed during the Estado Novo regime to commemorate the glory of Portuguese history, the pillory along the Avenida de Almeida Fortunato, was rebuilt in 1949, after the original was destroyed to make way for a road between Viseu and Nelas/Seia;

Other civic structures and buildings:

- Estate of Sacaduras (Portuguese: Solar dos Sacaduras)
- Old City Council of Aguieira (Portuguese: Casa Henriquina/Casa da Câmara da Aguieira)
- Primary School of Angieira (Portuguese: Escola primária de Aguieira)
- Residence of Godinho (Portuguese: Casa no Largo do Rossio)
- Residence of the Viscount of Pedralva (Portuguese: Casa Visconde de Pedralva)
- Residence Largo do Rossio (Portuguese: Casa no Largo do Rossio)
- Tower of Aguieira (Portuguese: Torreão em Aguieira)

The architecture of the early 20th century is also represented; at the street Rua Dr. Eurico do Amaral, Rua Luís de Camões, and Rua Sacadura Cabral; in the Largo General José Tavares, marked by a statue "Escanção por bem servir", dedicated to the Dão wine industry; and the 21st century Millenium Rotunda and its imposing iron sculpture.

Two important buildings to note, and patrimony of Nelas:

- The General José de Tavares, also known by the House of Tavares, located in Largo General José de Tavares (and identifiable by a coat-of-arms) was built in the 16th century, underwent major changes at the beginning of the 19th century (that included the destruction of the chapel and the mid-century passage of main roadway through its gardens);
- The House of the Rosados located along Rua Dr. Abel Pais Cabral, was built in the 1840s

=== Religious ===
Many old religious buildings continue to be used for worship within the municipality, although many have long since been transformed into other uses, owing to the events surrounding the expulsion of religious orders.

- Chapel of Caldas da Felgueira (Portuguese: Capela de Caldas da Felgueira)
- Chapel of Santo António (Portuguese: Capela de Santo António)
- Chapel of São Caetano (Portuguese: Capela de São Caetano)
- Chapel of São João Baptista (Portuguese: Capela de São João Baptista)
- Chapel of São Nicolau (Portuguese: Capela de São Nicolau)
- Chapel of São Sebastião (Portuguese: Capela de São Sebastião)
- Chapel of Senhor dos Aflitos (Portuguese: Capela do Senhor dos Aflitos)
- Church of São Simão (Portuguese: Igreja Matriz de Aguieira/Igreja de São Simão)
- Church of the Salvador (Portuguese: Igreja Matriz de Canas de Senhorim/Igreja do Salvador)
- Cross of Vale de Medeiros (Portuguese: Cruzeiro em Vale de Medeiros)
- Residence of the Cross (Portuguese: Casa do Cruzeiro)
