= Jacques de Sores =

French pirate

- Jacques de Sores and his men kill and throw into the Ocean Inácio de Azevedo and his forty companions. Copper engraving from Richard Verstegen's Theatrum Crudelitatum Haereticorum Nostri Temporis, Antwerp, A. Huberti, 1587
- Born: 16th century France
- Died: 16th century
- Other name: L'Ange Exterminateur
- Movement: Huguenot pirates

Jacques de Sores, nicknamed L'Ange Exterminateur (The Exterminating Angel), was a French pirate and corsair who attacked and burnt Havana, Cuba in 1555.

== Life ==
Other than his attack on Havana, little is known of de Sores. He was nicknamed "The Exterminating Angel" ("L'Ange Exterminateur"). He was the leader of a band of Huguenot pirates and a lieutenant or former lieutenant of another French pirate, François Le Clerc, who was called "Pegleg" or "Jambe de Bois" on account of his wooden leg. Le Clerc and Sores had set out from France in 1553 with three royal ships and a number of privateers under commission from Francis I of France who was envious of the riches returning to Spain from the New World. Le Clerc had raided Santiago de Cuba in 1554, and some accounts mention a raid on Santiago de Cuba by de Sores, although whether this was as part of the attack by Le Clerc is not clear. He may have used Cayo Romano and Cayo Coco in the archipelago of Jardines del Rey adjacent to the northern Cuban coast as a base of operations.

Details of the attack on Havana are also sketchy: the number of ships that de Sores used in the attack varies in different accounts from 2 to 20. Regardless of the number of ships involved, de Sores had little trouble in capturing the lightly defended town. Most accounts make it clear that he was expecting to find stores of gold in the town, while some claim he ransomed important members of the population. All agree that whatever his intention he was frustrated: he did not find vast reserves of gold in the city, and if he ransomed the population the ransom was mostly not paid. He destroyed the fortress of La Fuerza Vieja in today's Calle Tacón and burnt most of the town. He also burnt the shipping in the harbour and laid waste to much of the surrounding countryside, and seems to have found time to organise a play "to insult the pope". The ease with which de Sores had captured the town prompted the Spanish crown to start a massive fortification programme. The Castillo de la Real Fuerza was built to replace the Vieja Fuerza and later the Castillo de los Tres Reyes Magos del Morro and the smaller Castillo de San Salvador de la Punta were built on opposite sides of the entrance to Havana harbour.

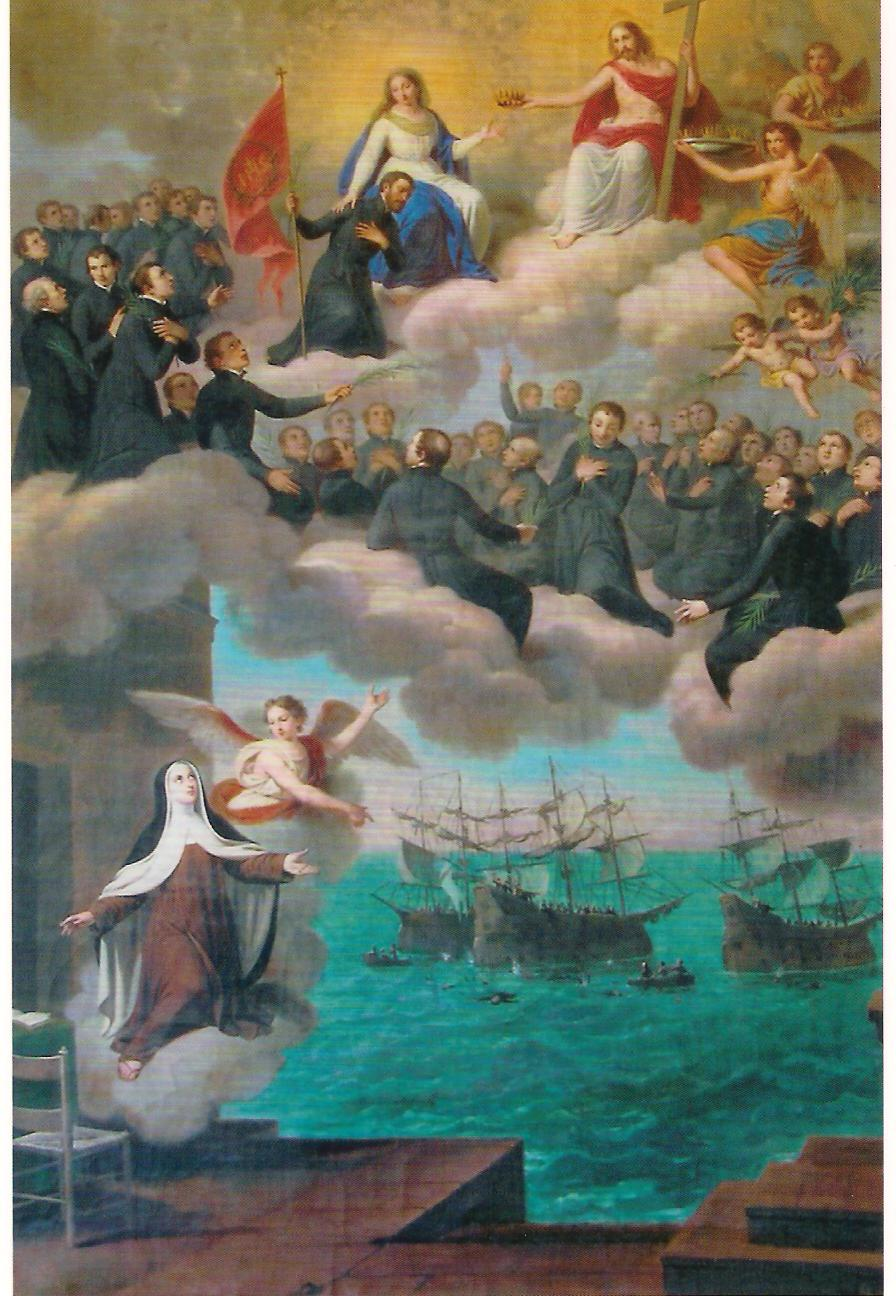
The vision of Saint Teresa of Ávila of the Forty Martyrs of Brazil, the capture of the São Tiago is depicted below.

On the morning of 15 July 1570, off Santa Cruz de La Palma, Canary Islands, he sighted the Portuguese merchant galleon São Tiago (also spelled Santiago), which was carrying Jesuits and colonists to Brazil. His five carracks approached the São Tiago and boarded, capturing it. He murdered 40 Jesuit Portuguese missionaries, dismembered and threw their bodies into the sea off Tazacorte – crosses on the sea floor still mark the site at Malpique today. Inácio de Azevedo was one of the Forty Martyrs of Brazil, beatified by Pope Pius IX in 1854.

== See also ==
- France-Americas relations
