= Marcela Rodríguez Acosta =

Spanish trans woman repressed by Franco and democracy

- Born: February 21, 1955 (age 71); Tazacorte, Spain
- Occupation: LGBTQ activist

Marcela Rodríguez Acosta (born February 21, 1955) is a Spanish trans woman who was repressed by Francoism and later also by the transition and the subsequent democracy.

== Life and career ==
Marcela was born on February 21, 1955, in the municipality of Tazacorte, in La Palma, and at the age of 7 she moved with her family to Tenerife. From an early age she showed signs of her gender dissent, such as when at the age of 6 she went out into the street wearing a blue dress with ruffles, only to be reprimanded by her sister, who took her back into the house and gave her several spankings.

In 1967, when she was only 12 years old, she dropped out of school and began working in a car wash. In her adolescence, unable to find work due to her gender identity, because trans women could not access employment for being considered "faggots", she began working as a pusher selling hashish, a privileged situation compared to her companions, who were forced to resort to prostitution.

During her youth, both she and her friends, also transgender, were detained many times for their identity, in application of the Law on Dangerousness and Social Rehabilitation, being detained for up to 15 days in a single month, with a single detention lasting up to 72 hours. This situation led her to participate in the first public Canary demonstration in favor of sexual freedom and against the Law on Social Dangerousness, which took place in 1978 in the García Sanabria Park of Santa Cruz de Tenerife. That same year she participated in a beauty contest for trans women that took place in the local Why not?, which she won. Marcela received a prize from the owner of the venue and also received the title of Miss Travesti. She competed in the carnival of her municipality since she was a child, but it was not until 1989 that she was able to register for the first time with her real name.

She married her then-boyfriend in 2005, but had to divorce years later to access financial aid, agreeing to and still maintaining her romantic relationship with him.

Throughout her life Marcela has also been a key figure in the social life of Santa Cruz de Tenerife, participating for decades in the carnival in the adult category (and winning on many occasions), as well as participating in events such as the Coso Apoteósico or the Burial of the Sardine.

== Awards and recognition ==
Marcela was one of the four protagonists of the documentary Memorias aisladas (Isolated Memories), by Dani Curbelo, in which he interviewed 4 LGBT people who suffered Francoist repression in the Canary Islands.

In December 2021, the municipality of Santa Cruz de Tenerife inaugurated a new municipal space as a form of tribute to Marcela, known as the Marcela Rodríguez Acosta Municipal Center for Diversity, in an act that was attended by the mayor of the municipality and the councilor for equality and diversity.
