= Isabel de Bobadilla =

Spanish governor of Cuba

- Inés de Bobadilla
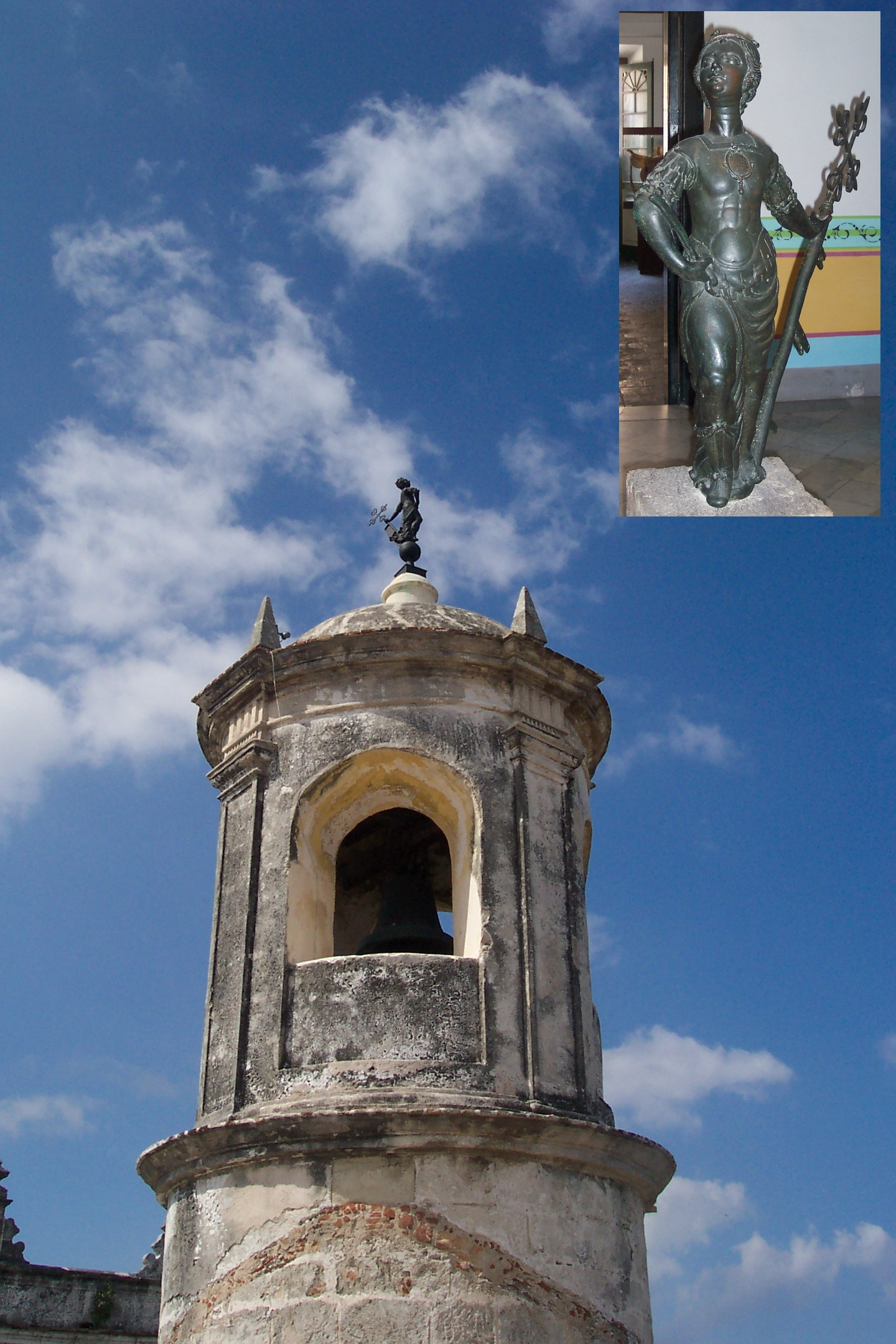
- La Giradilla on the watchtower of the Castillo de la Real Fuerza, Cuba

3rd Governor of Cuba
- In office May 17, 1539 – 1544
- Monarch: Carlos I of Spain
- Preceded by: Hernando de Soto
- Succeeded by: Juanes de Ávila

Personal details
- Born: 1505 Corona de Castilla
- Died: 1554 (aged 48–49) Spanish Empire
- Spouse: Hernando de Soto
- Occupation: Governor of Cuba from 1539–1543

Isabel de Bobadilla, or Inés de Bobadilla (c. 1505–1554) was the first female governor of Cuba from 1539 to 1543.

== Background ==
Isabel was born to a family closely associated with the exploration and conquest of the Americas. She was the third child of Pedro de Arias and Isabel de Bobadilla y Peñalosa. Pedro de Arias was one of conquerors of Central America and also the governor of Nicaragua. Isabel's mother was niece to Beatriz de Bobadilla, a close acquaintance of Isabella I of Castile and served as the matriarch of two of the most powerful and richest families in Spain, the Bobadillas and Peñalosas. Isabel de Bobadilla (daughter) is also granddaughter to Francisco de Bobadilla, who was appointed to succeed Christopher Columbus as the second governor of the Indies in 1499.

== Marriage and kinship ==
Isabel de Bobadilla married the prominent explorer and conquistador Hernando de Soto in 1537, who was in charge of one of the first European expeditions into what is now the United States. In 1535–36, Isabel must have been in her late twenties or early thirties, which suggests that she may have been a widow or, in some way, seen as an undesirable mate because women from powerful families were typically married before they reached their late twenties. The Conveyance of Dower is a document that was signed at Valladolid on November 14, 1536. The Conveyance of Dower lists all the cattle that had belonged to Pedro de Arias in Panama, the estate, the slaves, and the horses as a "pure and perfect gift irrevocable in favour." This document verifies the wealth of Bobadilla's family and also shows how Isabel's marriage to de Soto was a business arrangement between a very powerful Spanish family and an established conquistador.

Hernando de Soto was named governor of Cuba and Adelantado de Florida, and both arrived in Cuba in 1538. Documents show that Isabel brought to Cuba her slaves, including three white slaves who were Christians, possibly baptized Moors. Within the first couple weeks of 1539, the first couple of Cuba purchased at least four plantations near the city of Havana, with the largest plantation at Cojimar on the coast just east of the bay.

== Government ==
Isabel de Bobadilla was given power of attorney on May 17, 1539, when Hernando de Soto left Havana for the exploration and conquest of Florida [la Florida]. De Soto also appointed Juan de Rojas to serve as Bobadillas deputy in Havana and Francisco de Guzman to serve as her deputy in Santiago. Both of these men had served in this capacity before de Soto and Bobadilla arrived in Cuba. There were several political factions who were competing for power and control in Spain through exploration and control of unexplored territories. Among the important people involved in these "grand plans of exploration" were Álvar Núñez Cabeza de Vaca, Hernán Cortés, Pedro de Alvarado, Hernando de Soto, and Antonio de Mendoza. This illustrates how in the midst of the Spanish conquistadors, Isabel de Bobadilla was appointed to a highly politicized and powerful role.

Historians have conflicting opinions on why Isabel de Bobadilla was given the power to govern Cuba; Márquez Sterling indicates that Isabel was made governor only because de Soto did not want to stay in Cuba while surviving documents show that Isabel was the governor both de jure and de facto. Rodrigo Ranjel, de Soto's private secretary in Cuba and la Florida, described Isabel as having inherited her mother's fortitude, intelligence, and strength of character, and, like her mother, she was "a woman of great essence and goodness, and of very noble judgement and character." De Soto also confirmed Isabel's abilities by giving her the power of attorney, naming her governor of the island of Cuba.
In 16th century Spain, it was extremely rare that a woman would be appointed to a high office position. Isabel became the first female governor of Cuba and the first woman governor of a territory in the Western Hemisphere. The only other woman who served in high office in the 16th century Spanish colonies was Aldonza Villalobos Manrique of Venezuela (es), who inherited the governorship of the Margarita Province when her father, Marcelo Villalobas, died in 1526.
Bobadilla was also acknowledged as governor by the King of Spain in letters directly sent to her. As the governor, Isabel was able to handle many issues faced by all New World governors, including problems between the Indigenous Cubans and Europeans. Isabel Bobadilla contributed to the fortification of Cuba against rivals by advancing the construction of Havana's first fortress La Fuerza. La Fuerza was finished by Isabel de Bobadilla to defend the city against frequent enemy attacks; nevertheless, French pirates led by Jacques de Sores sacked Havana and burned La Fuerza in 1555.

== Lawsuit against Ponce de Leon ==
Isabel de Bobadilla filed a 3,720 page lawsuit, known as Justicia, against Hernán Ponce de León covering the time period of 1540–45. Ponce de Leon was a former partner of de Soto in his explorations of Peru and Nicaragua. The lawsuit recounts the controversies among the inheritors of De Soto and Francisco Vasquez de Coronado, Hernán Cortés, and the viceroy of Mexico; and also includes de Soto's Residencia, which was the investigation carried out in 1554 (after his death) to determine whether or not he had fulfilled all of his responsibilities outlined in his asiento. Ponce de Leon claimed that de Soto did not fulfill his obligations by not equally sharing his new found fortune and wealth from the Peru and Nicaragua explorations. Hernán Ponce de León and Hernando de Soto arrived at an agreement over this issue, before de Soto left for his Florida expedition.

However, when de Soto left, Ponce de León secretly took legal action saying that de Soto did not fulfil their previous agreement and that de Soto intimidated him into signing the agreement. Doña Isabel heard of this legal action, when she was appointed governor, and had seized the document from Ponce de Leon. She then waited for a ship that was in Havana harbor bound for Spain to leave, leaving Hernán with no way out of Cuba, then sent him a letter asking why he had behaved so badly. As the governor, she ordered Ponce de Leon not to leave Havana until he had renounced his secret legal action and drew up a document, that Ponce de Leon would sign, repudiating his repudiation. Doña Isabel was an able and strong leader who used her power to promote her self-interest as seen in this lawsuit against a powerful Spanish conquistador. There is no further information on how this lawsuit concluded.

== Death and legend ==
=== Death ===
In December 1543, Rodrigo Arangel brought the news to Doña Isabel in Havana of de Soto's death. After his death, Isabel auctioned off thousands of items belonging to her and her husband before she left Cuba for Spain. These items included everything from a ranch in Mayabeque Province, complete with native laborers, several hundred heads of cattle, and 500 yucca plants to Soto's house in Havana containing eighteen household slaves, a rosary made of thirty-two solid-gold beads, and a collar and cap made of black velvet. After auctioning off her and her husband's items she raised "more than four thousand pesos of gold," which she used to move back to Spain. The circumstances of Isabel de Bobadilla's death are uncertain. Some people claim she moved back to Spain with the money she received while others believe that, after she heard of her husband's death, she was "broke with grief upon hearing it, and a few days later she died.

=== Legend ===
La Giraldilla is a bronze wind statue of a woman who is surveying the horizon to her north and is located on top of the Castillo de la Real Fuerza in Old Havana, Cuba. The local Cuban people claim that this bronze statue is a depiction of Doña Isabel de Bobadilla and it is suggested that it was placed there to honor Inès de Bobadilla, who is said to have watched every day for the return of her husband.

== Bibliography ==
- Conquistadoras : mujeres heroicas de la conquista de América; Carlos B Vega; Jefferson, NC : McFarland & Co., 2003. OCLC 52799815
- Leyendas cubanas : a collection of Cuban legends; Olympia B González; Lincolnwood, Ill. : National Textbook Company, 1997. OCLC 36475899
- Maura, Juan Francisco. Españolas de Ultramar Colección Parnaseo-Lemir. Valencia: Publicaciones de la Universitat de València, 2005.
