= Juanes (disambiguation) =

Juanes is a Colombian musician, member of the rock band Ekhymosis and now a solo artist.

Juanes may also refer to:

People

- Juanes de Ávila or Juanes Dávila (1514–????), Licentiate in law and civil servant of the Spanish Empire who was governor and captain general of Cuba between 1544 and 1546
- Ángel Juanes Peces (born 1947), Spanish judge who served as President of the Audiencia Nacional (2009–2014) and as first Vice President of the Spanish Supreme Court (2014–2019)

Places

- Church of Santos Juanes, Valencia, a Roman Catholic church located in the Mercat neighborhood of the city of Valencia, Spain

== See also ==
- Los cuatro Juanes, 1966 Mexican drama film directed by Miguel Zacarías
- Juan, a given name, the Spanish language and Manx language versions of John
