= Forty Martyrs of Brazil =

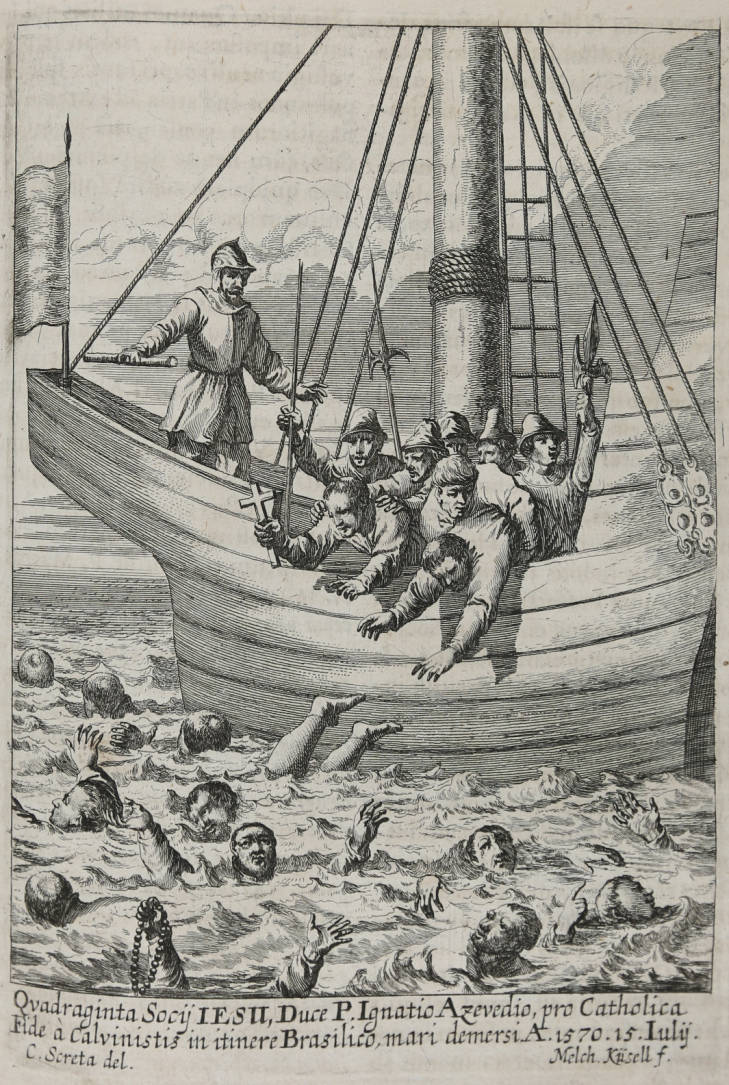
Engraving by Melchior Küsel depicting the 40 martyrs of Brazil.

The Forty Martyrs of Brazil (also known as the Martyrs of Tazacorte) were a group of forty young Jesuits – 32 Portuguese and 8 Spanish – who were put to death by Huguenot privateers after their ship, bound for Brazil, was captured off the Canary Islands. Taken prisoner, the missionaries were executed on July 15, 1570. Beatified collectively by Pope Pius IX on May 11, 1854, they are commemorated liturgically on July 15 (July 17 in Portugal).

== The event ==
In 1569, Inácio de Azevedo returned to Europe from Brazil to recruit volunteers for the Brazilian mission. On 5 June 1570, he set sail again with 86 missionaries: 70 Jesuits and 16 laymen. As the newly appointed Provincial of Brazil, he was in charge of the group. The flotilla, consisting of three ships led by the merchant vessel Santiago, departed from Lisbon on 5 June. A week later, they reached the island of Madeira, their first port of call. There, the group was warned that the presence of the French Huguenot privateer Jacques de Sores made the surrounding waters dangerous, prompting the flotilla to remain in port for a time.

The captain of the Santiago faced pressure from the merchants financing the voyage and decided to set sail again, despite the danger. However, Azevedo ensured that only volunteers remained on board, while four individuals choose to disembark in Funchal. The expedition was heading for La Palma, the second planned stop in the Canary Islands, where goods were to be delivered and supplies stocked in preparation for the long transatlantic crossing. There were forty Jesuits on board: Azevedo was accompanied by another priest, a deacon, fourteen coadjutor brothers and twenty-three students, most of whom came from the scholasticate in Coimbra.

The Forty Martyrs of Brazil, 1587, copper engraving in: Richard Verstegen, Theatrum Crudelitatum Haereticorum Nostri Temporis, Antwerp, A. Huberti, 1587

The ship reached Tazacorte, on the west coast of La Palma, without incident. Upon going ashore, the Jesuits held a religious service in the village church. The ship then set sail for Santa Cruz de La Palma on the east coast, but near the southern cape – off the coast of Fuencaliente – it was intercepted by five privateer vessels. Overwhelmed by the number of attackers, the ship was captured and the passengers taken prisoner. Following the capture of the Santiago, the attackers spared the lives of some members of the crew but Azevedo and his 39 companions were murdered, dismembered and threw into the sea off Tazacorte.

Only one of them, named João Sanches, survived, as one of the privateer ships required his services as a cook. When the privateers docked at La Rochelle, Sanches managed to escape and flee to Portugal, where he revealed the tragic fate of his companions. The news spread rapidly throughout Europe and caused a great stir.

== Canonization ==
Recognized as martyrs for the faith by Gregory XV in 1623 and Benedict XIV in 1742, they were beatified by Pius IX on 11 May 1854. The liturgical commemoration of the forty blessed martyrs takes place on 15 July and 17 July in Portugal. In the calendar of the Society of Jesus, they are grouped with other Jesuit martyrs and commemorated on 19 January. In 1999, forty concrete crosses at the place of martyrdom, about 200 meters off the Fuencaliente Lighthouse were placed on the seabed by the government of the island of La Palma. Adjacent to the old tower, another monument for the Forty Martyrs of Brazil has been erected in October 2014. This monument is a stone cross, with a plate on which the names of the martyrs are engraved.

== List of martyrs ==
1. Inácio de Azevedo, priest and Provincial of Brazil (b. Porto, Portugal)
2. Diogo de Andrade, priest (b. Pedrógão Grande, Portugal)
3. Bento de Castro, brother, scholastic (b. Chacim, Macedo de Cavaleiros, Portugal)
4. António Soares, brother, scholastic (b. Trancoso, Beira, Portugal)
5. Manuel Álvares, coadjutor brother (b. Estremoz, Portugal)
6. Francisco Álvares, coadjutor brother (b. Covilhã, Portugal)
7. Domingos Fernandes, brother, scholastic (b. Borba, Portugal)
8. João Fernandes, brother, scholastic (b. Braga, Portugal)
9. João Fernandes, brother, 19-year-old novice, scholastic (b. Lisbon, Portugal)
10. António Correia, brother, scholastic (b. Porto, Portugal)
11. Francisco de Magalhães, brother, scholastic (b. Alcácer do Sal, Portugal)
12. Marcos Caldeira, brother (b. Santa Maria da Feira, Portugal)
13. Amaro Vaz, coadjutor brother (b. Bem Viver, Marco de Canaveses, Portugal)
14. Juan de Mayorga, coadjutor brother (b. Saint-Jean-Pied-de-Port, Navarre)
15. Alfonso de Baena, coadjutor brother (b. Villatobas, Toledo, Spain)
16. Esteban de Zudaire, coadjutor brother (b. Zudaire, Améscoa Baja, Navarre, Spain)
17. Juan de San Martín, brother, scholastic (b. Yuncos, Toledo, Spain)
18. Juan Zafra, coadjutor brother (b. Jerez de los Caballeros, Badajoz, Spain)
19. Francisco Pérez Godoy, brother, scholastic (b. Torrijos, Toledo, Spain)
20. Gregorio Escribano, coadjutor brother (b. Viguera, La Rioja, Spain)
21. Fernando Sánchez, brother, scholastic (b. Old Castile, Spain)
22. Gonçalo Henriques, brother, scholastic (b. Porto, Portugal)
23. Álvaro Mendes Borralho, brother, scholastic (b. Elvas, Portugal)
24. Pedro Nunes, brother, scholastic (b. Fronteira, Portugal)
25. Manuel Rodrigues, brother, scholastic (b. Alcochete, Portugal)
26. Nicolau Dinis, brother, scholastic (b. Bragança, Portugal)
27. Luís Correia, brother, scholastic (b. Évora, Portugal)
28. Diogo Pires Mimoso, brother, scholastic (b. Nisa, Portugal)
29. Aleixo Delgado, brother, scholastic (b. Elvas, Portugal)
30. Brás Ribeiro, coadjutor brother (b. Braga, Portugal)
31. Luís Rodrigues, brother, scholastic (b. Évora, Portugal)
32. André Gonçalves, brother, scholastic (b. Viana do Alentejo, Portugal)
33. Gaspar Álvares, brother, scholastic (b. Porto, Portugal)
34. Manuel Fernandes, brother, scholastic (b. Celorico da Beira, Portugal)
35. Manuel Pacheco, brother, scholastic (b. Ceuta)
36. Pedro Fontoura, coadjutor brother (b. Chaves, Portugal)
37. António Fernandes, coadjutor brother (b. Montemor-o-Novo, Portugal)
38. Simão da Costa, coadjutor brother (b. Porto, Portugal)
39. Simão Lopes, brother, scholastic (b. Ourém, Portugal)
40. João Adauto ("John the Added"), (b. Entre-Douro-e-Minho, Portugal)

== Bibliography ==
- Herbermann, Charles, ed. (1913). "Bl. Ignacio de Azevedo" . Catholic Encyclopedia. New York: Robert Appleton Company.
