= Castillo de la Real Fuerza =

16th-century fortification in Havana, Cuba

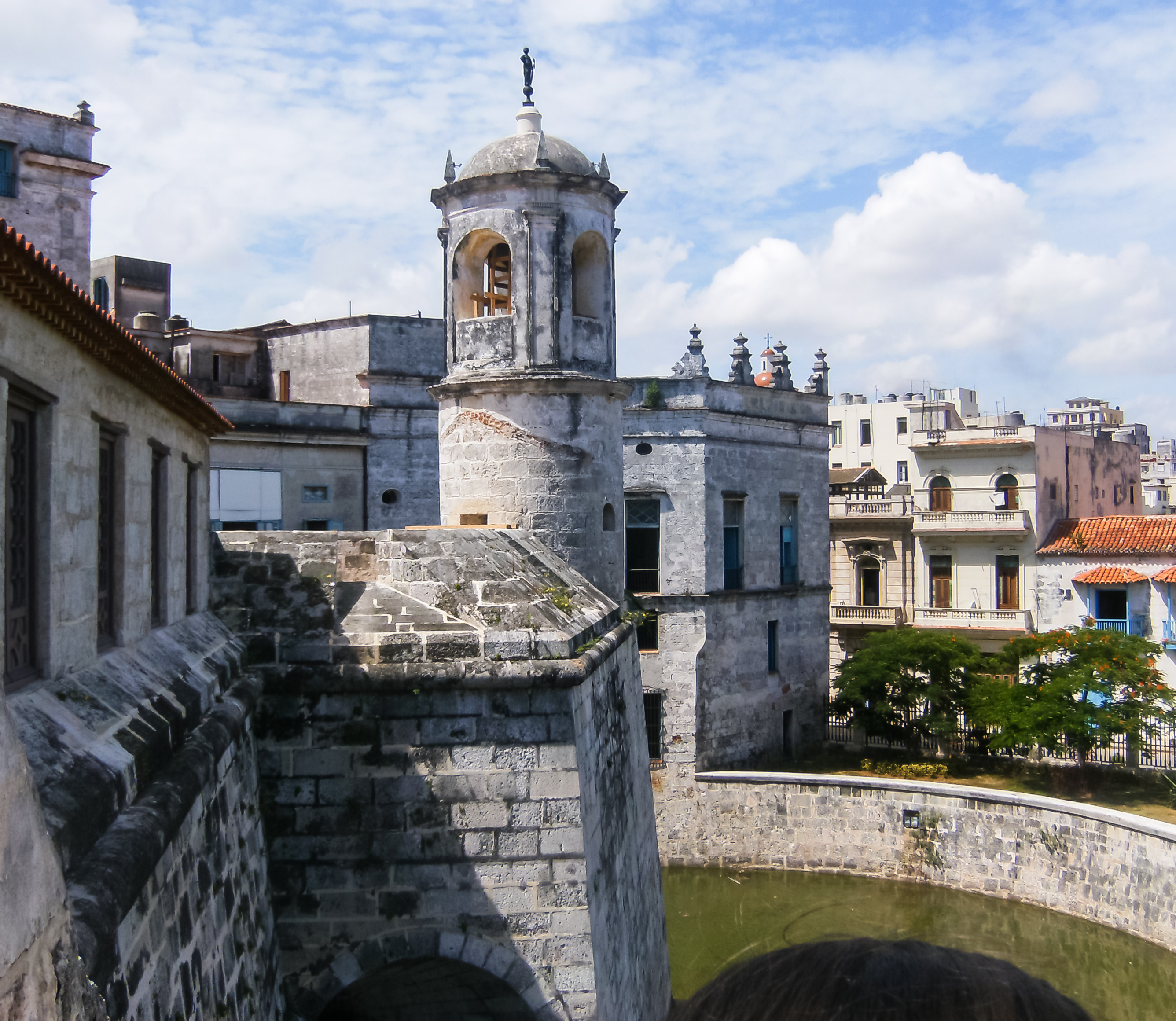
- Interactive map of the Castillo de la Real Fuerza area

General information
- Groundbreaking: 1558
- Completed: 1577

Technical details
- Structural system: Load bearing
- Material: Masonry

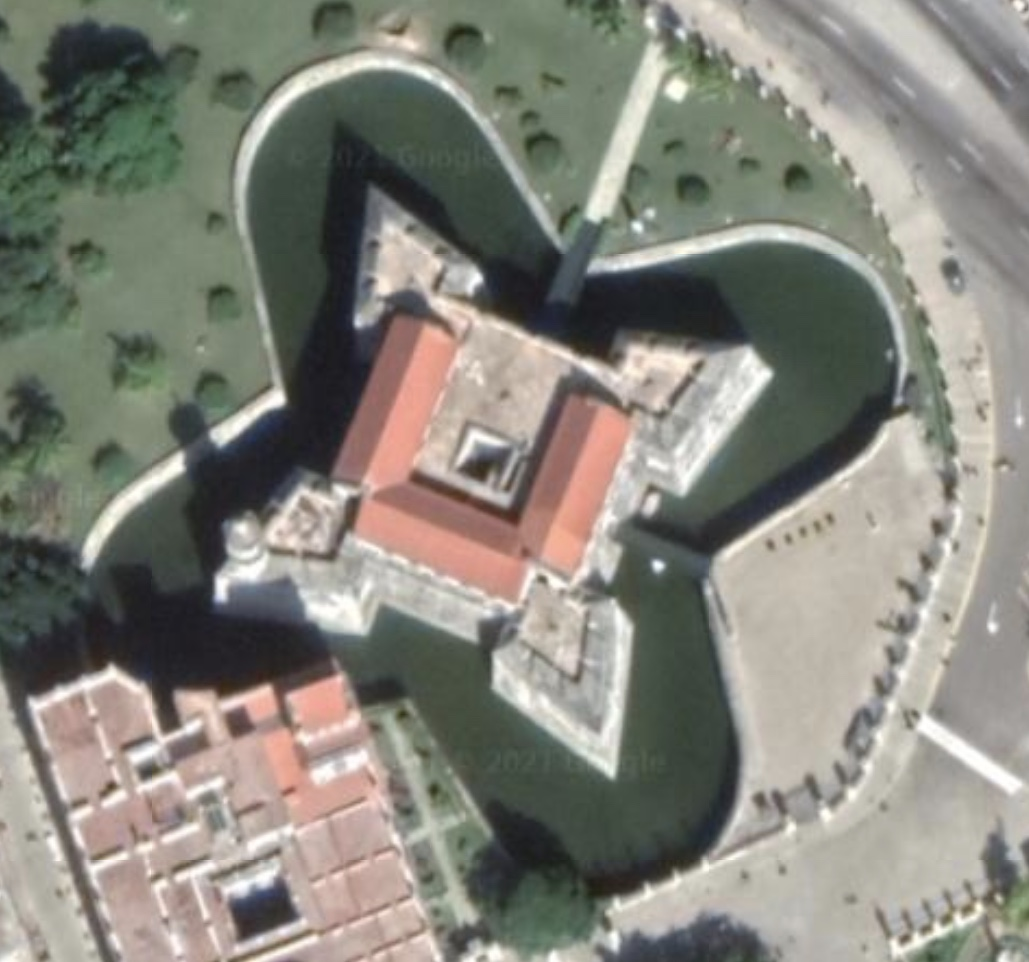
Castillo de la Real Fuerza, Havana, Cuba

The Castillo de la Real Fuerza (Castle of the Royal Force) is a bastion fort on the western side of the harbour in Havana, Cuba, set back from the entrance, and bordering the Plaza de Armas. Originally built to defend Havana against attack by pirates, it was not strategically located, being too far inside the bay, and instead was adopted as the residence of the Governor of Havana. The fort is considered to be the oldest stone fort in the Americas, and was listed in 1982 as part of the UNESCO World Heritage Site of "Old Havana and its Fortifications".

== History ==
A previous fort, the Fuerza Vieja (Old Fort), was damaged in 1555 during an attack on Havana by the French privateer Jacques de Sores, and eventually was demolished in 1582. In 1558 Bartolomé Sánchez, an engineer appointed by King Philip II of Spain, began work on the new fort, initially known as the Fuerza Nueva (New Fort). The Fuerza Vieja was set back from the harbor, but the new fort was planned to be closer to the harbor to give it a better location. The ironworks were established in 1558, but the first stones were not laid until 1562. Construction was delayed due to complaints from local residents forced to relocate to make way for the building and from disagreements between Sánchez and the Governor of Havana. The fort was not completed until 1577, with slaves and French prisoners providing most of the labor. The fort was built of limestone quarried from the Havana shoreline and the fortification incorporated thick sloping walls, a moat, and a drawbridge. The governor, Francisco Carreño, ordered the addition of an upper story as barracks and a munitions store, but on completion, the fort proved to be too small for practical use.

Despite being positioned closer to the harbour than the Fuerza Vieja, it quickly became apparent that the new fort was still too distant from the mouth of the harbour to serve effectively as a defensive bulwark. Instead Juan de Tejeda adopted it as the residence of the Governor of Havana. Subsequent governors made changes to the building. The façade of the fortress was demolished in 1851 to allow O’Reilly Street to go all the way to the docks, and prevent the fort from overshadowing El Templete, which was completed in 1828.

== Cuba under attack (1500 - 1800) ==
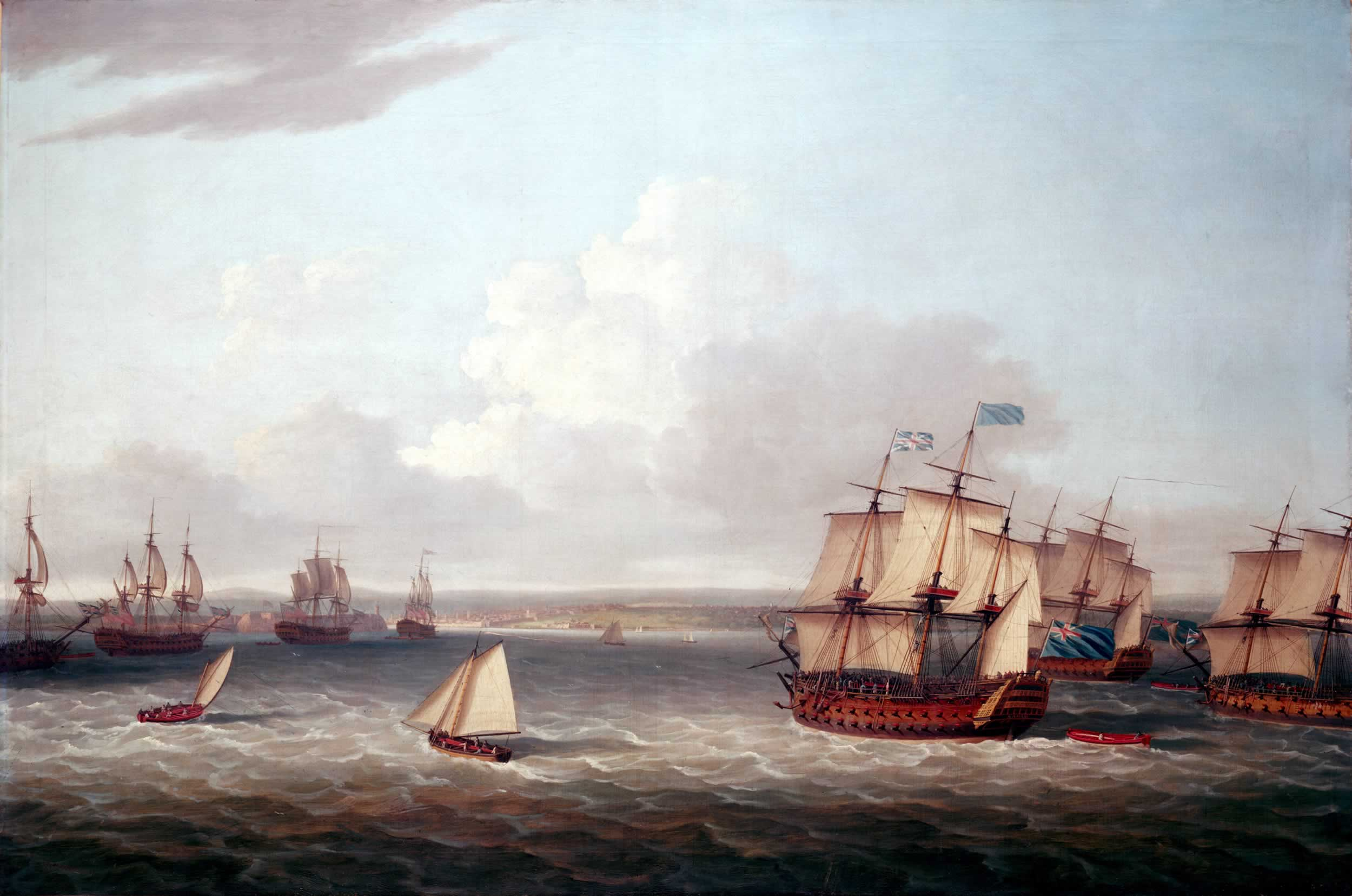
The British Fleet Entering Havana, 21 August 1762, a 1775 painting by Dominic Serres

Colonial Cuba was a frequent target of buccaneers, pirates and French corsairs seeking Spain's New World riches. In response to repeated raids, defenses were bolstered throughout the island during the 16th century. In Havana, the fortress of Castillo de los Tres Reyes Magos del Morro was built to deter potential invaders, which included the English privateer Francis Drake, who sailed within sight of Havana harbor but did not disembark on the island. Havana's inability to resist invaders was dramatically exposed in 1628, when a Dutch fleet led by Piet Heyn plundered the Spanish ships in the city's harbor. In 1662, Christopher Myngs with a small fleet sortied from Jamaica captured and briefly occupied Santiago de Cuba on the eastern part of the island, in an effort to open up Cuba's protected trade with neighboring Jamaica.

Nearly a century later, the British Royal Navy launched another invasion, capturing Guantánamo Bay in 1741 during the War of Jenkins' Ear with Spain. Edward Vernon, the British admiral who devised the scheme, saw his 4,000 occupying troops capitulate to raids by Spanish troops, and more critically, an epidemic, forcing him to withdraw his fleet to British Jamaica. In the War of the Austrian Succession, the British carried out unsuccessful attacks against Santiago de Cuba in 1741 and again in 1748. Additionally, a skirmish between British and Spanish naval squadrons occurred near Havana in 1748.

The Seven Years' War, which erupted in 1754 across three continents, eventually arrived in the Spanish Caribbean. Spain's alliance with the French pitched them into direct conflict with the British, and in 1762 a British expedition of five warships and 4,000 troops set out from Portsmouth to capture Cuba. The British arrived on 6 June, and by August had Havana under siege. When Havana surrendered, the admiral of the British fleet, George Keppel, the 3rd Earl of Albemarle, entered the city as a new colonial governor and took control of the whole western part of the island. The arrival of the British immediately opened up trade with their North American and Caribbean colonies, causing a rapid transformation of Cuban society.

Though Havana, which had become the third-largest city in the Americas, was to enter an era of sustained development and closening ties with North America during this period, the British occupation of the city proved short-lived. Pressure from London sugar merchants fearing a decline in sugar prices forced a series of negotiations with the Spanish over colonial territories. Less than a year after Havana was seized, the Peace of Paris was signed by the three warring powers, ending the Seven Years' War. The treaty gave Britain Florida in exchange for Cuba on France's recommendation to Spain, The French advised that declining the offer could result in Spain losing Mexico and much of the South American mainland to the British. In 1781, General Bernardo de Gálvez, the Spanish governor of Louisiana, reconquered Florida for Spain with Mexican, Puerto Rican, Dominican, and Cuban troops.

== Isabel de Bobadilla ==
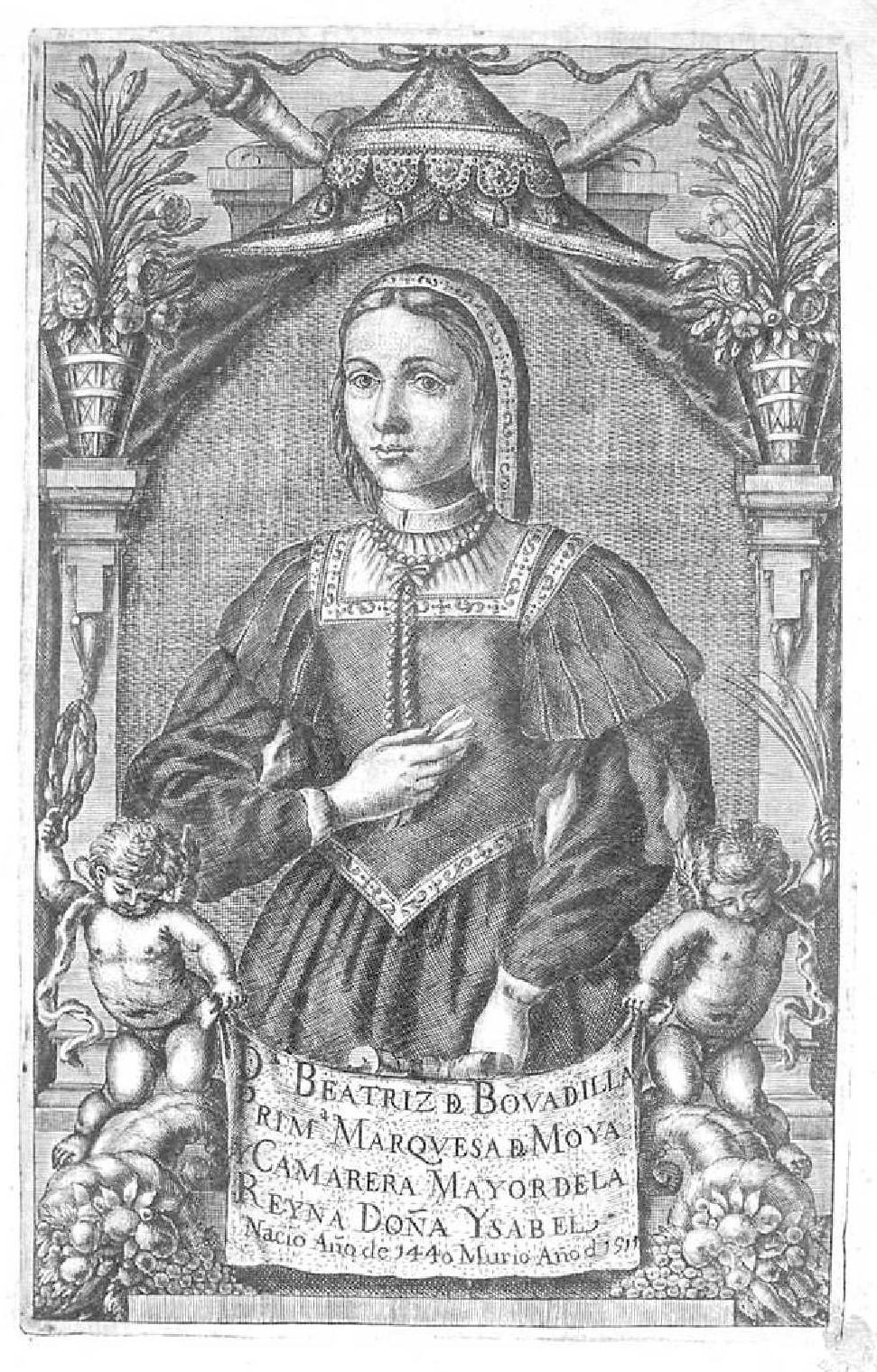
Isabel de Bobadilla, governor of Cuba from 1539 to 1543

Isabel de Bobadilla, or Inés de Bobadilla (c. 1505–1554) was the first female governor of Cuba from 1539 to 1543.

== Background ==
Isabel was born to a family closely associated with the exploration and conquest of the Americas. She was the third child of Pedro de Arias and Isabel de Bobadilla y Peñalosa. Pedro de Arias was one of conquerors of Central America and also the governor of Nicaragua. Isabel's mother was niece to Beatriz de Bobadilla, a close acquaintance of Isabella I of Castile and served as the matriarch of two of the most powerful and richest families in Spain, the Bobadillas and Peñalosas. Isabel de Bobadilla (daughter) is also granddaughter to Francisco de Bobadilla, who was appointed to succeed Christopher Columbus as the second governor of the Indies in 1499.

== Marriage and kinship ==
Isabel de Bobadilla married the prominent explorer and conquistador Hernando de Soto in 1537, who was in charge of one of the first European expeditions into what is now the United States. In 1535–36, Isabel must have been in her late twenties or early thirties, which suggests that she may have been a widow or, in some way, seen as an undesirable mate because women from powerful families were typically married before they reached their late twenties. The Conveyance of Dower is a document that was signed at Valladolid on November 14, 1536. The Conveyance of Dower lists all the cattle that had belonged to Pedro de Arias in Panama, the estate, the slaves, and the horses as a "pure and perfect gift irrevocable in favour." This document verifies the wealth of Bobadilla's family and also shows how Isabel's marriage to de Soto was a business arrangement between a very powerful Spanish family and an established conquistador.

Hernando de Soto was named governor of Cuba and Adelantado de Florida, and both arrived in Cuba in 1538. Documents show that Isabel brought to Cuba her slaves, including three white slaves who were Christians, possibly baptized Moors. Within the first couple weeks of 1539, the first couple of Cuba purchased at least four plantations near the city of Havana, with the largest plantation at Cojimar on the coast just east of the bay.

== Government ==
Isabel de Bobadilla was given power of attorney on May 17, 1539, when Hernando de Soto left Havana for the exploration and conquest of Florida [la Florida]. De Soto also appointed Juan de Rojas to serve as Bobadillas deputy in Havana and Francisco de Guzman to serve as her deputy in Santiago. Both of these men had served in this capacity before de Soto and Bobadilla arrived in Cuba. There were several political factions who were competing for power and control in Spain through exploration and control of unexplored territories. Among the important people involved in these "grand plans of exploration" were Alvar Nunez, Cabeza de Vaca, Hernán Cortés, Pedro de Alvarado, Hernando de Soto, and Antonio de Mendoza. This illustrates how in the midst of the Spanish conquistadors, Isabel de Bobadilla was appointed to a highly politicized and powerful role.

Historians have conflicting opinions on why Isabel de Bobadilla was given the power to govern Cuba; Márquez Sterling indicates that Isabel was made governor only because de Soto did not want to stay in Cuba while surviving documents show that Isabel was the governor both de jure and de facto. Rodrigo Ranjel, de Soto's private secretary in Cuba and la Florida, described Isabel as having inherited her mother's fortitude, intelligence, and strength of character, and, like her mother, she was "a woman of great essence and goodness, and of very noble judgment and character." De Soto also confirmed Isabel's abilities by giving her the power of attorney, naming her governor of the island of Cuba. In the 16th century Spain, it was extremely rare that a woman would be appointed to a high office position. Isabel became the first female governor of Cuba and the first woman governor of a territory in the Western Hemisphere. The only other woman who served in high office in the 16th-century Spanish colonies was Aldonza Manrique of Venezuela, who inherited the governorship when her father, Marcelo Villalobos, died in 1526. Bobadilla was also acknowledged as governor by the King of Spain in letters directly sent to her. As the governor, Isabel was able to handle many issues faced by all New World governors, including problems between the Indigenous Cubans and Europeans. Isabel Bobadilla contributed to the fortification of Cuba against rivals by advancing the construction of Havana's first fortress La Fuerza. La Fuerza was finished by Isabel de Bobadilla to defend the city against frequent enemy attacks; nevertheless, French pirates led by Jacques de Sores sacked Havana and burned La Fuerza in 1555.

== La Giraldilla ==
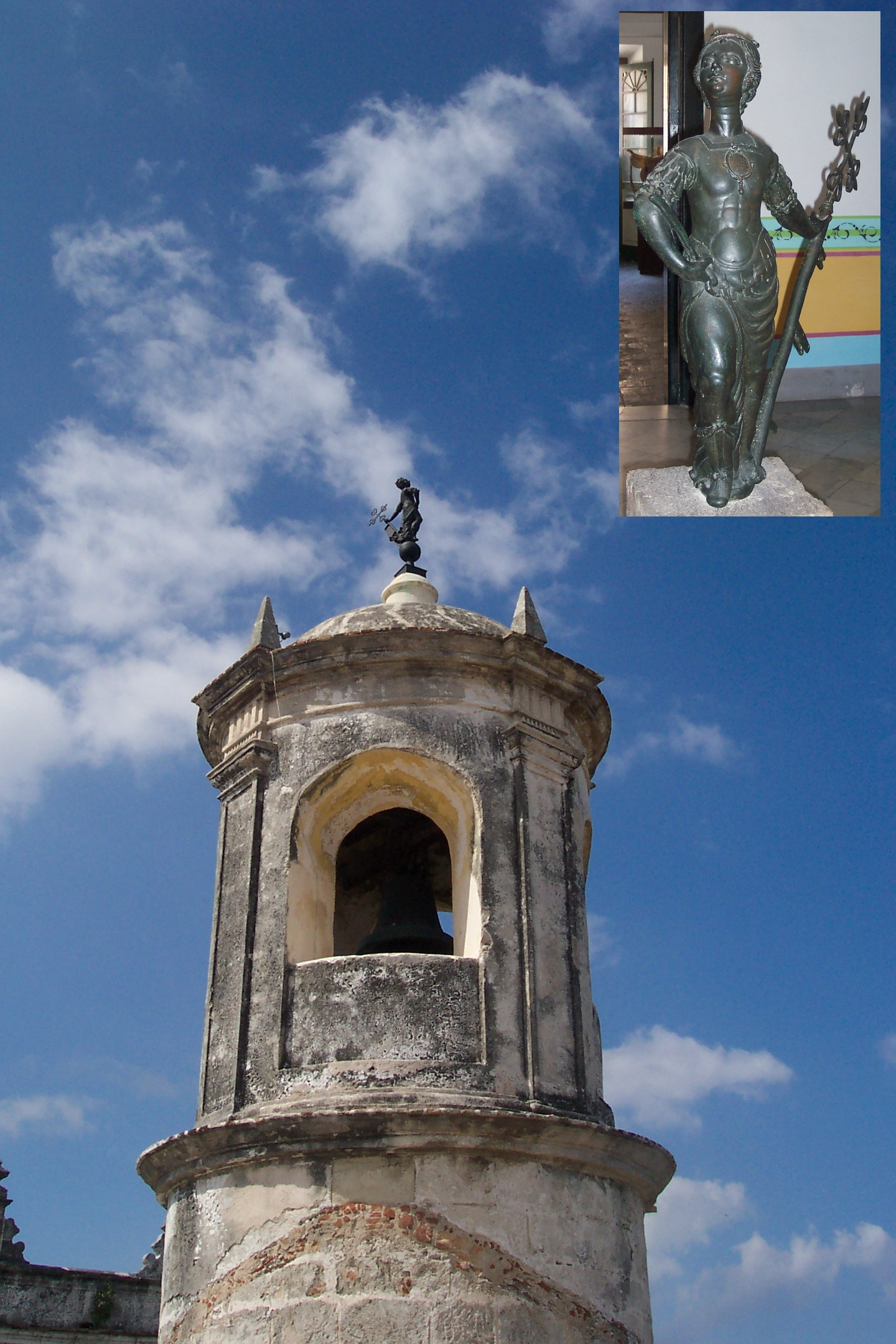
La Giradilla on the watchtower (inset: The original figurine, which is now held in the Palacio de los Capitanes Generales)

In 1634, Juan Vitrián de Viamonte added a watchtower with a weathervane sculpted in the form of a woman, by Gerónimo Martín Pinzón, an artist from Havana, and based on the figure crowning La Giralda in Seville. Although the reason for the choice of this figure, called La Giraldilla, is not known, a common belief is that it honours Isabel de Bobadilla, Havana's only female governor, who assumed control from her husband Hernando de Soto when he undertook an expedition to Florida. She spent many years scanning the horizon for signs of his returning ship (unbeknownst to her, he had died.) The figure became the symbol of the city of Havana (it features on the Havana Club rum label), and the original is now in the City Museum housed in the Palacio de los Capitanes Generales in the Plaza de Armas; the figure on the watchtower is a later copy.

== Death and legend ==
In December 1543, Rodrigo Arangel brought the news to Dona Isabel in Havana of her husband the explorer and conquistador Hernando de Soto’s death. After his death, Isabel auctioned off thousands of items belonging to her and her husband before she left Cuba for Spain. These items included everything from a ranch at Maybeque, complete with native laborers, several hundred heads of cattle, and 500 yucca plants to Soto’s house in Havana containing eighteen household slaves, a rosary made of thirty-two solid-gold beads, and a collar and cap made of black velvet. After auctioning off her and her husband items she raised "more than four thousand pesos of gold," which she used to move back to Spain. The circumstances of Isabel de Bobadilla's death are uncertain. Some people claim she moved back to Spain with the money she received while others believe that after she heard of her husband's death, she was "broke with grief upon hearing it, and a few days later she died.

La Giraldilla is a bronze wind statue of a woman who is surveying the horizon to her north and is located on top of the Castillo de la Real Fuerza in old Havana, Cuba. The local Cuban people claim that this bronze statue is a depiction of Dona Isabel de Bobadilla and it is suggested that it was placed there to honor Inès de Bobadilla, who is said to have watched every day the return of her husband.

== Function ==
The fort was home to the National Archive from 1899 and the National Library from 1938 up until 1957, when both were relocated to a purpose-built library in Plaza de la Revolución. After the Cuban Revolution in 1959, the fort housed the offices of the National Commission of Monuments and the Centre of Preservation, Restoration, and Museology. The fort served briefly as the Museum of Arms, but the conditions within the fortress were not conducive to the preservation of the displays.

In 1977, on the 400th anniversary of completion, the building was inaugurated as a museum and used to display exhibitions of Cuban contemporary and international art. In 1990, it became the National Museum of Cuban Ceramics.

In 2010, Castillo de la Real Fuerza reopened as Cuba's maritime museum. The museum contains exhibits of Cuba's maritime past from pre-Columbian days through to the 18th century with the Royal Shipyard of Havana, one of the largest in the world, which built nearly 200 ships for the Spanish Crown. The museum features a huge four-meter model of the Santisima Trinidad located on the main floor with a large interactive touch screen in Spanish, French, and English. The exhibit describes life aboard an 18th-century ship-of-the-line. The original ship was launched into Havana Bay on 2 March 1769 and was the largest ship in the world in the 18th century, with 140 cannons on four gun decks. She was one of four Cuban-built ships at the Battle of Trafalgar in 1805. The downstairs exhibits contain ancient navigational instruments, underwater archaeological artifacts, and gold and silver from the colonial era. The museum also hosts the original weathervane, La Giraldilla, while a replica is installed on the top of the fortress tower. The second level of the museum hosts many other historic and contemporary models of ships with links to Cuba and offers locations for viewing the harbor and city skyline.

== Gallery ==
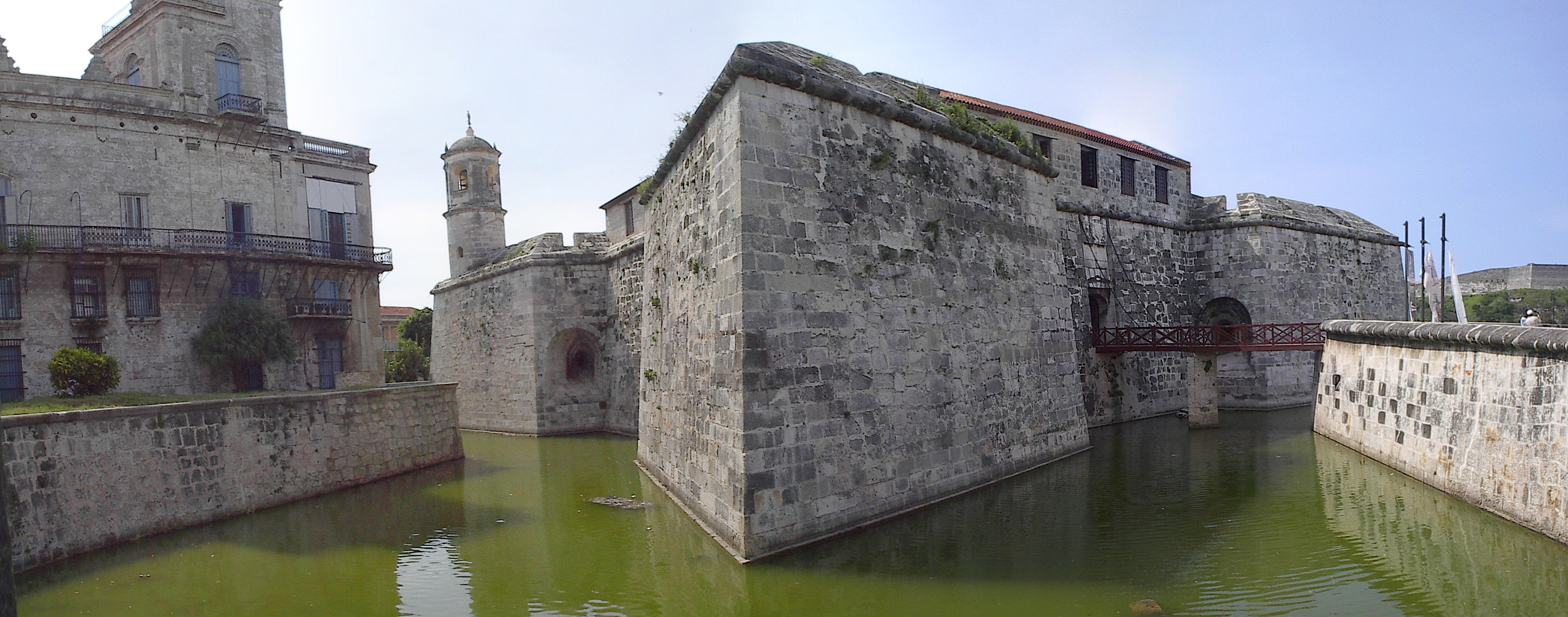

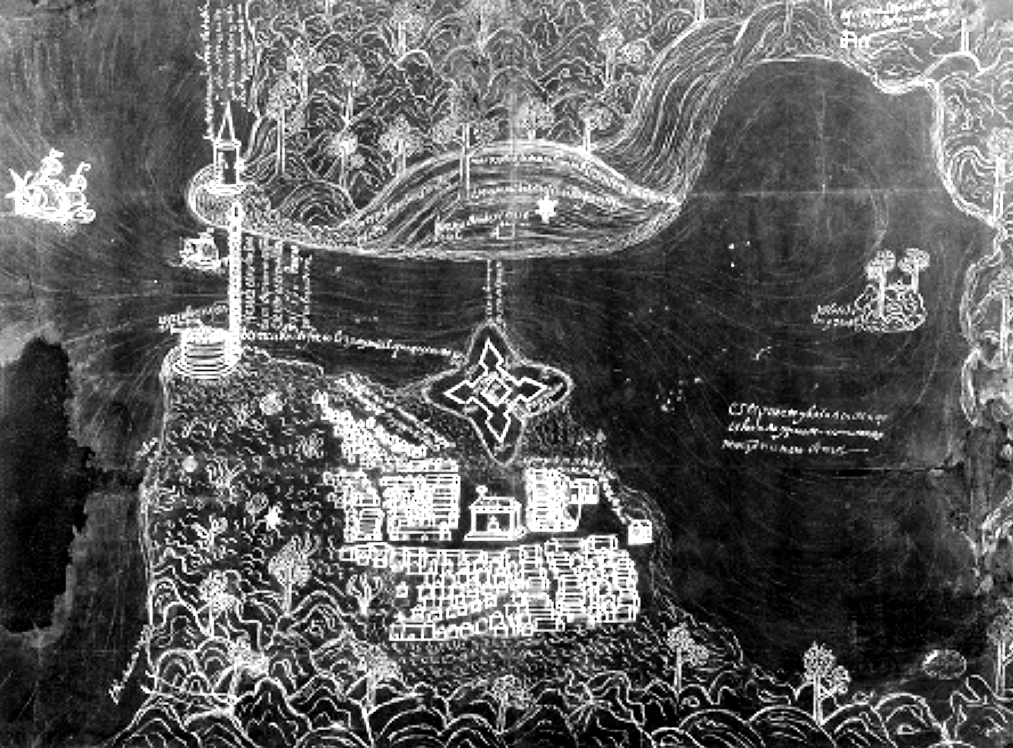
Castillo-del-la-Real-Fuerza. By Francisco Calvillo, 1576

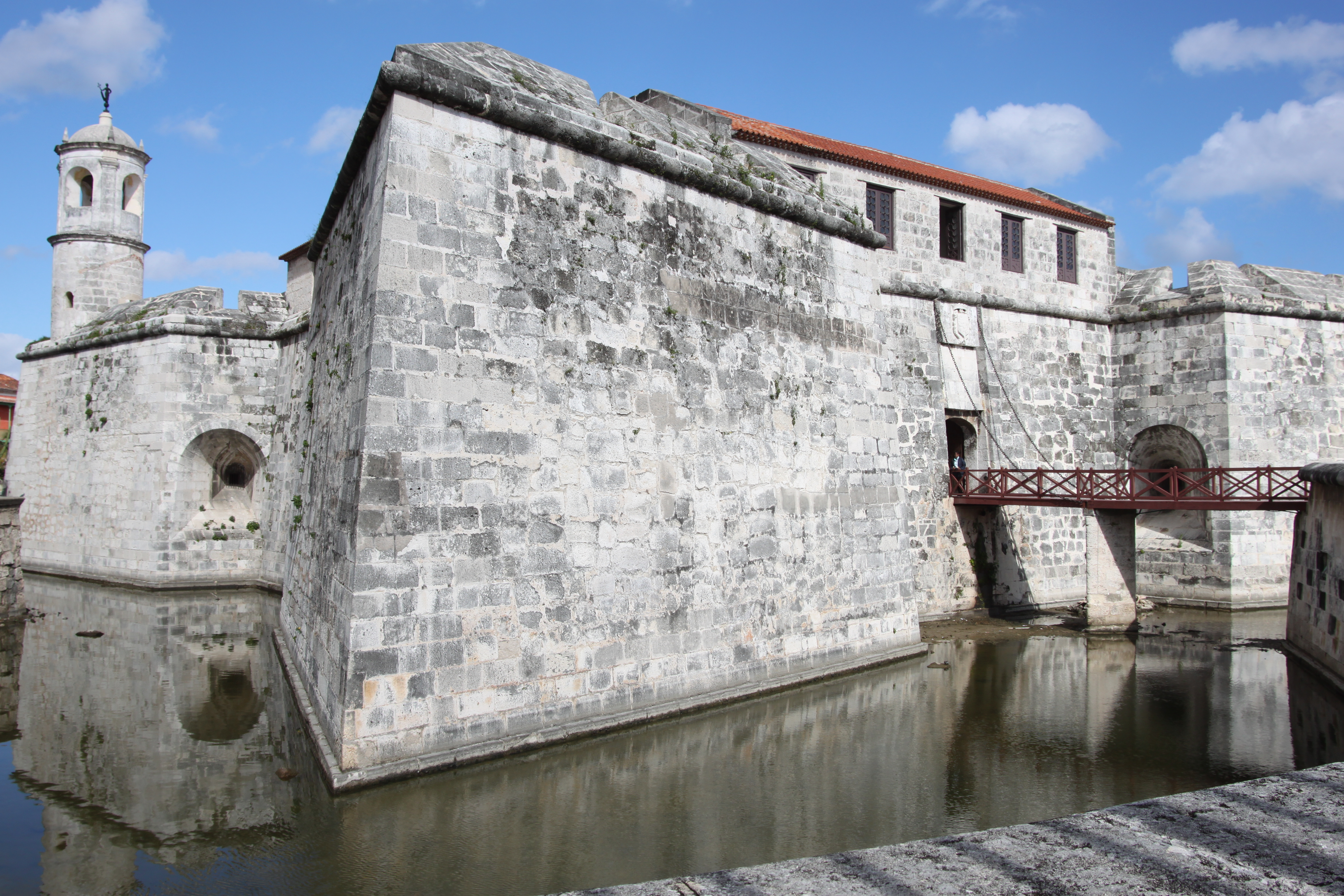

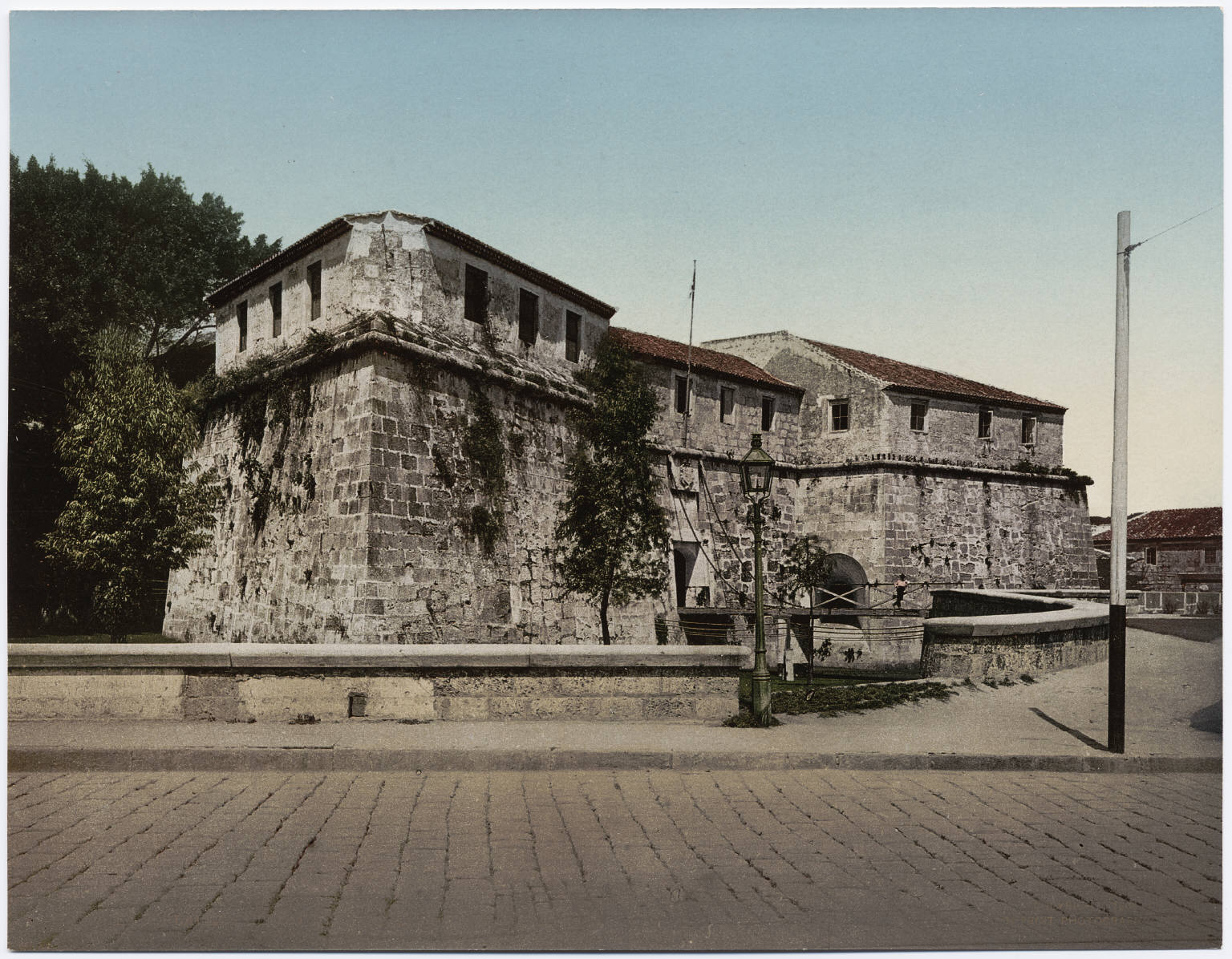
Fortaleza, Havana, circa 1897–1924, photochrom postcard published by the Detroit Photographic Company. Beinecke Rare Book & Manuscript Library.

== See also ==
- List of buildings in Havana
- Treaty of Paris (1763)
- Batería de la de la Reina
- Castillo San Salvador de la Punta
- Santa Clara Battery
- Castillo del Príncipe (Havana)
- Torreón de San Lázaro
- La Cabaña
- Castillo de Atarés
- Timeline of Havana

== Bibliography ==
- Conquistadoras : mujeres heroicas de la conquista de América; Carlos B Vega; Jefferson, NC : McFarland & Co., 2003. OCLC 52799815
- Leyendas cubanas : a collection of Cuban legends; Olympia B González; Lincolnwood, Ill. : National Textbook Company, 1997. OCLC 36475899
- Maura, Juan Francisco. Españolas de Ultramar Colección Parnaseo-Lemir. Valencia: Publicaciones de la Universitat de València, 2005.
