= Juanes de Ávila =

Spanish civil servant and colonial governor

4th Governor of Cuba
- In office 1544–1546
- Monarch: Carlos I of Spain
- Preceded by: Isabel de Bobadilla
- Succeeded by: Antonio de Cháves

Personal details
- Born: 1514 Corona de Castilla
- Died: 16th century Spanish Empire
- Occupation: Civil servant and Colonial governor

Juanes de Ávila or Juanes Dávila (born 1514, died in the 1500s) was a Licentiate in law and civil servant of the Spanish Empire who was governor and captain general of Cuba between 1544 and 1546.

== Biography ==
Juanes de Ávila was born in the Crown of Castile. He received a licentiate degree. He was named governor and captain general of Cuba in 1544, and arrived in Santiago de Cuba on February 10, 1544.

During his administration, Dávila developed monopolies to his own benefit, restricted municipal councils, intimidated Cuban inhabitants and accepted bribes, so he was charged and sent to trial. He died in the Spanish Empire in the 16th century.
