= Theatrum Crudelitatum Haereticorum Nostri Temporis =

1587 series of etchings by Richard Verstegen

Theatre of the Cruelties of the Heretics in our own Times
- Theatrum Crudelitatum Haereticorum Nostri Temporis (Latin)
- The Forty Martyrs of Brazil, 1587, copper engraving in: Richard Verstegan, Theatrum crudelitatum, Antwerp, A. Huberti, 1587, p. 55
- Artist: Richard Verstegen
- Year: 1587
- Medium: etching
- Subject: Religious persecution
- Dimensions: 21.6 cm × 16.3 cm (8.5 in × 6.4 in)

Theatrum Crudelitatum Haereticorum Nostri Temporis (English: Theatre of the Cruelties of the Heretics in our own Times) is the title of a work written by Anglo-Dutch writer and publisher Richard Verstegen and published in Antwerp in 1587. The author’s objective was to provide a detailed account of the violence perpetrated by Protestants against Catholics in England, France, Ireland, Belgium, and the Netherlands.

== Description ==
Verstegen was a London-born English Catholic, who fled the country to escape religious persecution and spent most of his adult life in exile. He probably conceived his Theatrum as a response to works such as John Foxe's Book of Martyrs (1563), which illustrate the alleged atrocities committed by Catholics against Protestant.

The work was a theological-political denunciation of the persecutions that erupted in the wake of the Protestant Reformation, and served as a warning to the French public about the dangers of a Protestant accession. It consists of a series of 29 engravings depicting graphic persecutions, tortures, and executions of Roman Catholics carried out by the Huguenots during the French Wars of Religion, by the Geuzen during the Eighty Years' War, and by English protestants under Henry VIII and Elizabeth I. Each print is paired with a descriptive Latin text, commentary, and biblical/didactic captions explaining the martyrdom scene. The final engraving in the series depicts the execution of Mary, Queen of Scots in 1587. The prints are not signed, but are likely the work of Verstegan himself, given his early experience in the field of engraving. Latin verses under the illustrations, and some preliminary verses, were provided by the Flemish Neo-Latin poet Joannes Bochius.

In sharp contrast with traditional martyrologies, Verstegan's engravings "depict the Catholic victims of Calvinist, Huguenot, and Protestant violence not as heroic martyr figures who might help console readers or inspire contemplation or emulation, but as brutalized and helpless figures surrounded by frantically animated persecutors."

== Legacy ==
The Theatrum was extremely successful. According to McBride, it was "the one truly international, and highly popular, contemporary Catholic account of Protestant persecution". A second edition and a French translation appeared already in 1588. The work was reissued at least eight times up to 1607 and it provoked a demand for Verstegen's extradition to face a claim of libel against Elizabeth I. While in Paris in 1588, Verstegan was briefly imprisoned pending extradition to England at the insistence of the English ambassador, Sir Edward Stafford, but the French king refused Francis Walsingham's demands for Verstegan's extradition to stand trial for high treason, at the insistence of both the Catholic League and the papal nuncio. Verstegan was therefore quietly released and moved to the papal court in Rome, where he lived for a few years.

== Gallery ==
Plate 1: Frontispiece

Plate 2: Primi noui euangelii fructus (The first fruits of the New Gospel)

Plate 3: Schismaticorum in Anglia crudelitas (The Cruelty of Schismatics in England)

Plate 4: Schismaticorum in Anglia crudelitas (The Cruelty of Schismatics in England)

Plate 5: Schismaticorum in Anglia crudelitas (The Cruelty of Schismatics in England)

Plate 6: Horribilia scelera ab Huguenotis in Galliis perpetrata (Atrocious crimes committed by the Huguenots in France)

Plate 7: Horribilia scelera ab Huguenotis in Galliis perpetrata (Atrocious crimes committed by the Huguenots in France)

Plate 8: Horribilia scelera ab Huguenotis in Galliis perpetrata (Atrocious crimes committed by the Huguenots in France)

Plate 9: Horribilia scelera ab Huguenotis in Galliis perpetrata (Atrocious crimes committed by the Huguenots in France)

Plate 10: Horribilia scelera ab Huguenotis in Galliis perpetrata (Atrocious crimes committed by the Huguenots in France

Plate 11: Horribilia scelera ab Huguenotis in Galliis perpetrata (Atrocious crimes committed by the Huguenots in France)

Plate 12: Horribilia scelera ab Huguenotis in Galliis perpetrata (Atrocious crimes committed by the Huguenots in France

Plate 13: Horribilia scelera ab Huguenotis in Galliis perpetrata (Atrocious crimes committed by the Huguenots in France

Plate 14: Horribilia scelera ab Huguenotis in Galliis perpetrata (Atrocious crimes committed by the Huguenots in France

Plate 15: Horribilia scelera ab Huguenotis in Galliis perpetrata (Atrocious crimes committed by the Huguenots in France)

Plate 16: Horribilia scelera ab Huguenotis in Galliis perpetrata (Atrocious crimes committed by the Huguenots in France)

Plate 17: Horribilia scelera ab Huguenotis in Galliis perpetrata (Atrocious crimes committed by the Huguenots in France)

Plate 18: Horrenda inhumanitatis genera a Geusiis Belgicis peracta (Horrendous acts of inhumanity committed by the Belgian Geuzen)

Plate 19: Horrenda inhumanitatis genera a Geusiis Belgicis peracta (Horrendous acts of inhumanity committed by the Belgian Geuzen)

Plate 20: Horrenda inhumanitatis genera a Geusiis Belgicis peracta (Horrendous acts of inhumanity committed by the Belgian Geuzen)

Plate 21: Horrenda inhumanitatis genera a Geusiis Belgicis peracta (Horrendous acts of inhumanity committed by the Belgian Geuzen)

Plate 22: Horrenda inhumanitatis genera a Geusiis Belgicis peracta (Horrendous acts of inhumanity committed by the Belgian Geuzen)

Plate 23: Persecutiones aduersus Catholicos à Protestantibus Caluinistis excitae in Anglia (Persecutions instigated by Protestant Calvinists against Catholics in England)

Plate 24: Persecutiones aduersus Catholicos à Protestantibus Caluinistis excitae in Anglia (Persecutions instigated by Protestant Calvinists against Catholics in England)

Plate 25: Persecutiones aduersus Catholicos à Protestantibus Caluinistis excitae in Anglia (Persecutions instigated by Protestant Calvinists against Catholics in England)

Plate 26: Persecutiones aduersus Catholicos à Protestantibus Caluinistis excitae in Anglia (Persecutions instigated by Protestant Calvinists against Catholics in England)

Plate 27: Persecutiones aduersus Catholicos à Protestantibus Caluinistis excitae in Anglia (Persecutions instigated by Protestant Calvinists against Catholics in England)

Plate 28: Persecutiones aduersus Catholicos à Protestantibus Caluinistis excitae in Hibernia (Persecutions instigated by Protestant Calvinists against Catholics in Ireland)

Plate 28: Persecutiones aduersus Catholicos à Protestantibus Caluinistis excitae in Anglia (Persecutions instigated by Protestant Calvinists against Catholics in England)

Plate 28: Persecutiones aduersus Catholicos à Protestantibus Caluinistis excitae in Anglia (Persecutions instigated by Protestant Calvinists against Catholics in England)

== Bibliography ==
- Arblaster, Paul (2004). Antwerp & the World: Richard Verstegan and the International Culture of Catholic Reformation. Leuven: Leuven University Press. ISBN 978-9058673473.
- Corish, Patrick J.; Millet, Benignus, eds. (2005). "Dermot O'Hurley". The Irish martyrs. Irish theological quarterly monograph series. Vol. 1. Dublin: Four Courts Press. pp. 66–80. ISBN 9781851828586.
- Freedberg, David (1976). "The representation of martyrdoms during the early Counter-Reformation in Antwerp". The Burlington Magazine. 118: 128–38.
- Guiney, Louise Imogen (1939). The Recusant Poets: With a Selection from their Work: From Thomas More to Ben Jonson. Sheed & Ward.
- Highley, Christopher (2008). Catholics Writing the Nation in Early Modern Britain and Ireland. Oxford: OUP. ISBN 978-0191559884.
- Petti, A.G. (1963–1964). "A Bibliography of the Writings of Richard Verstegan (c.1550–1641)". Recusant History. 7: 82–103.
