= Richard Verstegen =

Anglo-Dutch antiquary, publisher, humorist and translator

Richard Verstegen (or Verstegan; c. 1550 – 1640), also known as Richard Rowlands, was an Anglo-Dutch antiquary, publisher, humorist and translator.

== Life and career ==
Verstegan was born in East London, the son of a cooper. His grandfather, Theodore Roland Verstegen, was a refugee from Guelders in the Spanish Netherlands who arrived in England around the year 1500. A convert to the Catholic Church, Rowlands produced an English translation of the Little Office of the Blessed Virgin Mary; the translation and primer prayer book that contained it remained among the most popular English Catholic devotionals for two centuries.

Under the patronym Rowlaunde, Richard came up to Christ Church, Oxford, in 1564, where he may have studied early English history and the Anglo-Saxon language. Having become a Catholic, he left the university without a degree to avoid swearing the Oath of Supremacy. Thereafter he was indentured to a goldsmith, and in 1574 became a freeman of the Worshipful Company of Goldsmiths. In 1576 he published a guidebook to Western Europe, translated from German, entitled The Post of the World.

At the end of 1581 he secretly printed an account of the execution of Edmund Campion but was discovered and 'being apprehended, brake out of England'. In exile, he resumed his ancestral Dutch surname of Verstegen (Anglicized Verstegan) and, in 1585 or 1586, he moved to the Spanish Netherlands. With covert financial support from the Spanish Crown, Verstegan set up a residence, "in Antwerp near the bridge of the tapestry makers", as a publisher, engraver, "a valued secret agent of the Spanish party", and a smuggler of banned books as well as Roman Catholic priests and laity to and from the British Isles.

Verstegan also used his many contacts throughout the strictly illegal and underground Catholic Church in England, Wales, and in Ireland to both write and publish detailed accounts of the sufferings of English, Welsh, and Irish Catholic Martyrs. To the fury of the English Court, Verstegan's books made the whole of Catholic Europe aware of the religious persecution taking place under the rule of Queen Elizabeth I.

=== Theatrum crudelitatum Hæreticorum nostri temporis ===
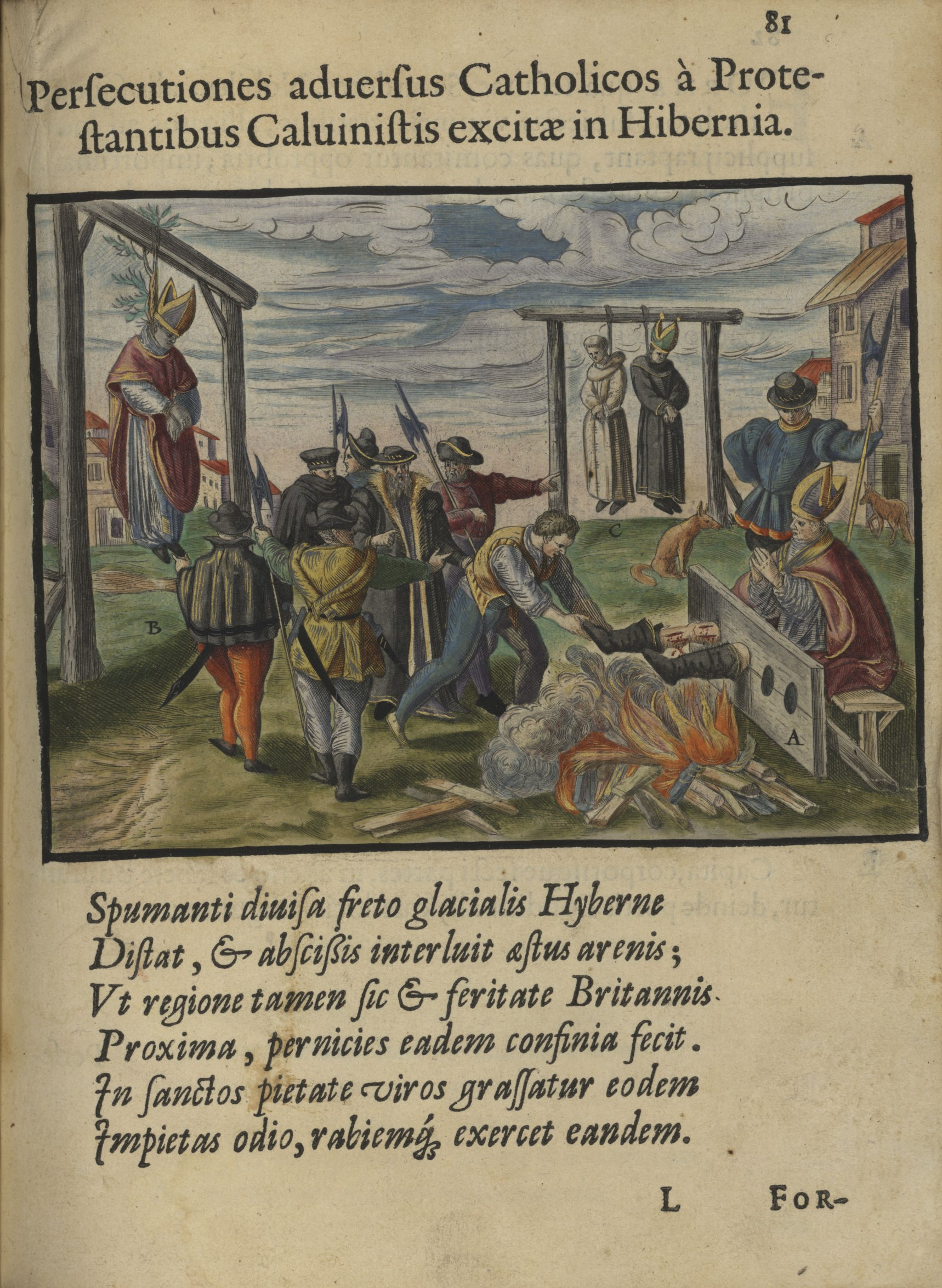
Richard Verstegen's color engraving of the 1584 torture and execution of Archbishop Dermot O'Hurley. The 1579 hanging of fellow Irish Catholic Martyrs Bishop Patrick O'Hely and Friar Conn Ó Ruairc is shown in the background.

Verstegan's detailed and highly influential Renaissance Latin volume Theatrum Crudelitatum Haereticorum Nostri Temporis ("Theatre of the Cruelties of the Heretics of our Time") was published in Antwerp in the Spanish Netherlands in 1587. Irish historian J.J. Meagher has written of the volume and of Verstegan, "He enhanced his account with an engraving which was a composite representation of the three Irish martyrs, Dermot O'Hurley, Patrick O'Healy, and Conn O'Rourke. The printed word helped considerably to propagate and preserve the reputation of martyrdom. There were at least eight editions of Verstegan's Theatrum up to 1607, and these contributed in no small way to maintaining the fama martyrii overseas."

While in Paris in 1588, Verstegan was briefly imprisoned pending extradition to England by King Henri III at the insistence of the English Ambassador, Sir Edward Stafford, who declared the book's claims of religious persecution a libel against Queen Elizabeth I, but, as the recent Latin-Middle French translation of Theatrum crudelitatum Hæreticorum nostri temporis had already heavily contributed to the ideology of the Catholic League during the French Wars of Religion, Verstegan had many influential sympathisers and protectors. At the insistence of both the Catholic League and the Papal Nuncio, the French King refused Sir Francis Walsingham's demands for Verstegan's extradition to England to stand trial for high treason and the exiled Englishman was quietly released. After his release, Verstegan lived briefly in Rome, where he was the recipient of a temporary pension from Pope Sixtus V.

=== Other works ===
In 1595, Verstegan published in Antwerp the Latin-Elizabethan English translation of An Epistle in the Person of Jesus Christ to the Faithful Soule by John Justus of Landsberg, which St. Philip Howard had made while imprisoned for Recusancy in the Tower of London. St. Philip Howard's literary translation of Marko Marulić's Renaissance Latin religious poem Carmen de doctrina Domini nostri Iesu Christi pendentis in cruce ("A Dialogue Betwixt a Christian and Christ Hanging on the Crosse"), was also published in lieu of an introduction in the Antwerp edition.

From 1617 to about 1630 Verstegan was a prolific writer in Dutch, producing epigrams, characters, jestbooks, polemics. He also penned journalistic commentaries, satires and editorials for the Nieuwe Tijdinghen (New Tidings) printed in Antwerp by Abraham Verhoeven from 1620 to 1629. This makes him one of the earliest identifiable newspaper journalists in Europe.

=== Latter days ===
According to Louise Imogen Guiney, "The poet passed his remaining days in Antwerp, beloved by the best names of his time, English or foreign; his closest friends were such men, among Protestants, as Ortelius or Bochins, Sir Thomas Gresham and Sir Robert Cotton, the index of whose manuscript collection in the British Museum names Verstegan more than once. He was also a friend and great correspondent of Father Robert Persons, S.J.: many of Verstegan's letters to the latter figure in the Westminster Cathedral Archives."

Although the exact date of Verstegan's death remains unknown, his will survives in Antwerp and bears the date of 26 February 1640.

== Legacy ==
=== Poetry ===
The verses celebrating the Battle of Kinsale and the defeat of the uprising by the Irish clans under Aodh Mór Ó Néill, Lord of Tír Eoghain, and Red Hugh O'Donnell, Lord of Tír Chonaill, and entitled England's Joy, by R. R. (1601), have mistakenly been attributed to Verstegan, as have other poems that were in reality composed, "by the notorious Richard Vennar or Vennard."

Verstegan did, however, compose an Elizabethan English elegy about the 1584 martyrdom of Blessed Dermot O'Hurley outside the walls of Dublin and entitled "The Fall of the Baron of Slane", several poems in praise of Thomas More, occasioned by the 1630 publication of the biography by the latter's great grandson, and a lullaby addressed to the Christ Child in the persona of the Blessed Virgin.

Louise Imogen Guiney, however, has commented that Verstegan's works of Christian poetry have, "a most rustic simplicity. At his best, he touches Southwell, as at about a half a dozen points in the lovely lullaby." A.O. Meyer later wrote of the same poems, "They are pervaded by the peace of a soul that has freed itself from all earthly things."

=== Journalism and satire ===
According to Louise Imogen Guiney, "A few of Verstegan's saying which have survived will show him to have had a caustic eighteenth-century sort of wit, with an endearing slyness almost like Steele's. He says, for example, that Holland is as fertile in sects as Italy is in mushrooms: new doctrines sprout overnight from the dreams of men. The Dutch ministers are less greedy of glory than merchants are, for these latter will rush to India to steal the profits of the Portuguese, whereas the former do not fly there to dispute with the Jesuits for the crown of martyrdom. Of the Irish, it is said that the inhabitants of this country, having observed that to obtain great wealth they must do hard work, have found it desirable to deprive themselves of the one, that they may do without the other. A striking passage deals in no hackneyed fashion with Queen Elizabeth. 'She had that instinctive malice that makes one pick out for hatred the very persons who have done one a good turn... She was not merely ungrateful, but her only response to a benefit received was to revenge it.' Such comments cannot have been without effect on Verstegan's generation."

== Works ==
Plate from Theatrum crudelitatum Hæreticorum nostri temporis (1587), depicting Protestant atrocities and religious persecution against Roman Catholics.

- The post of the vvorld ...the most famous cities in Europe, with their trade and traficke, with their wayes and distance of myles (1576)
- Theatrum crudelitatum Hæreticorum nostri temporis (= Theatre of the Cruelties of the heretics of our time) (1587)
- A Restitution of Decayed Intelligence in Antiquities concerning the most noble and renowned English Nation (1605; reprinted 1628, 1634, 1652, 1655, 1673). This includes the first English version of the story of the Pied Piper of Hamelin.
- Nederlantsche Antiquiteyten (1613; further editions 1631, 1646, 1662, 1700, 1701, 1705, 1714, 1725, 1733, 1756, 1809); an adaptation of the Restitution of Decayed Intelligence
- Neder-duytsche epigrammen op verscheyden saecken (Mechelen, Henry Jaye, 1617) – a volume of epigrams, available on Google Books
- De gazette van nieuwe-maren, van de gheheele wereldt. Ghemenght met oude waerheden. Hierby is oock ghevoegt eene wederlegginghe van eenighe onbequame Nederlandtsche spreuckwoorden (Antwerp, Hieronymus Verdussen, 1618)
- Sundry Successive Regal Governments in England (1620)
- Spiegel der Nederlandsche Elenden (1621)
- Scherp-sinnighe characteren. Oft subtijle beschrijvinghe (Antwerp, Willem Lesteens, 1622). Available on Google Books
- Oorloge ghevochten met die wapenen van die waerheydt en van die reden (Antwerp, Jan Knobbaert, 1628)
- Medicamenten teghen de melancholie (published by Hendrick Aertsens, 1633)
