= Tazacorte =

- Municipality
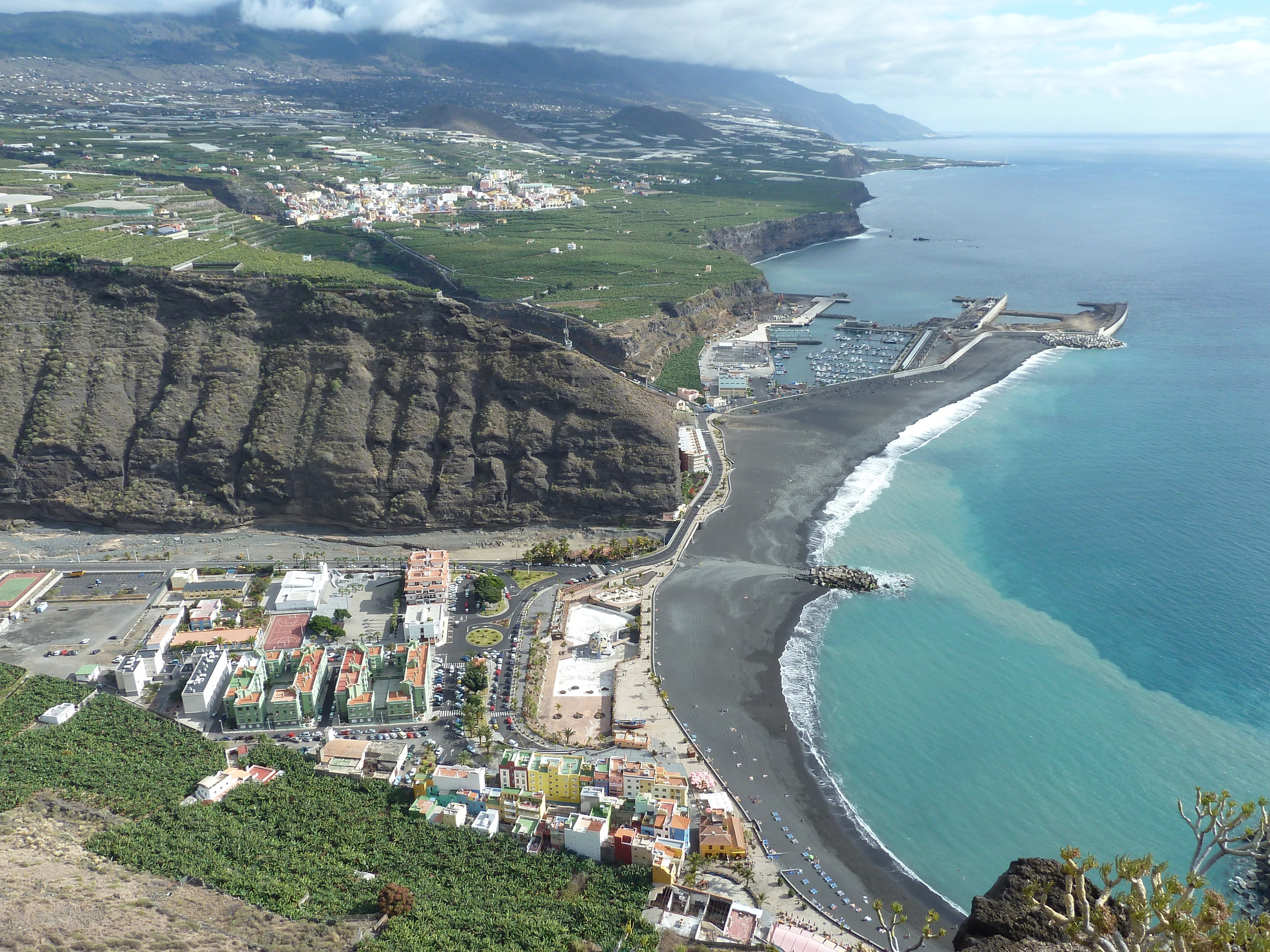
- The port of Tazacorte

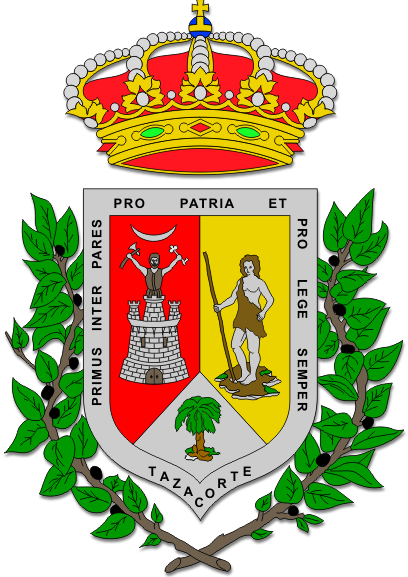
- Flag Coat of arms

- Location in La Palma

- Location in the Canary Islands Tazacorte (Spain, Canary Islands)
- Coordinates: 28°38′30″N 17°56′0″W
- Country: Spain
- Autonomous community: Canary Islands
- Province: Tenerife
- Island: La Palma

Area
  - Total: 11.37 km^{2} (4.39 sq mi)
- Elevation: 132 m (433 ft)

Population (2025-01-01)
  - Total: 4,549
  - Density: 400.1/km^{2} (1,036/sq mi)

Tazacorte is a town and a municipality on the island of La Palma, Province of Tenerife, Canary Islands, Spain. It is near the coast, in the western part of the island. The population of the municipality is 4,600 (2018) and the area is 11.37 km^{2}. The average elevation is 60 m. Tazacorte is 2 km southwest of Los Llanos de Aridane and 17 km west of the island capital Santa Cruz de La Palma. The inhabitants are known as Bagañetes.

Farmlands, producing almost exclusively bananas, occupy as much as 85% of the land area of Tazacorte. The widespread use, and occasional continued misuse, of insecticides has led to significant concern, as cancer rates for residents is higher than national statistics.

== History ==
Alonso Fernández de Lugo began the conquest of La Palma at the mouth of the Las Angustias ravine, where the Port of Tazacorte is located today, on 29 September 1492. He landed without resistance, which allowed a later peaceful settlement in the plain of Tazacorte, an enclave where the first camp was built and the chapel of San Miguel was erected, who became since then the patron saint of Tazacorte and the whole island of La Palma. Being this temple therefore, the patron saint of La Palma under the invocation of San Miguel Arcángel.

After successive sales and transfers, in 1513, the fertile Hacienda of Tazacorte was acquired by the Flemish Jacome Groenenberg, who would Hispanicise his name in Jácome Monteverde. From then on, the property would be dedicated to the cultivation of sugar cane, in an exploitation regime of semi-feudal characteristics. The anchorage of El Puerto de Tazacorte was the second most important in La Palma, after the capital. Since the sixteenth century, national and foreign ships that exported sugar cane, wine and other products of the country stopped in its bay. At the end of the eighteenth century the peasants of Tazacorte were poor of goods of fortune, badly eaten and badly dressed, and as main food they consumed fern roots.

On July 15, 1570, the Forty Martyrs of Brazil, consisting of a group of 32 Portuguese and 8 Spanish Jesuits bound for Brazil, were captured by Huguenot privateers near Fuencaliente and then executed off the coast of Tazacorte.

In August 1812, the municipality of Los Llanos was formed with the town of the same name as its head, plus El Paso, Argual and Tazacorte as its main settlements. In 1815, the productivity and profitability of sugar cane began to decrease. Sugar cane was a demanding plant and production declined in the exhausted soils of the region. In 1830, the last sugar mill in Tazacorte was closed and, from those dates are replaced by self-consumption crops, however from 1850 Tazacorte found in fishing and cochineal cultivation two economic activities that will bring wealth to some and means to subsist for others.

Since 1890, the growing production of tomatoes, first, and then bananas was added to the tobacco, sugar, and cochineal shipments that were still placed in foreign markets.

=== 20th century ===
The end of the Great War reopened European markets for bananas and tomatoes. From 1919 the British company Fyffes Limited, leases the farms of the biggest owners of the municipality. The company improves the banana plantations by selling more and more quantities and at a better price so that by the mid-twenties 70% of the population of Tazacorte was working in the banana export business.

In 1923, Tazacorte was the most populated area of the municipality of Los Llanos, with 2,316 inhabitants and the most economically developed area in the Aridane Valley.

In 1925, for 3 days they declared themselves an independent country from Spain, from which the following verses were written: "With bicheros, palos y cañas / let's shout with a voice of caliber / Viva Tazacorte free / and independent of Spain." During their three days of Independence, with their hunting guns, they did not let anyone cross their borders, until a Spanish warship arrived and dropped a howitzer that passed over the whole sky of the country, falling on the mountain of Argual which, although it was part of the foreign country, was still a few hundred metres from its capital, causing it to surrender. However, although they did not achieve Independence from Spain, they did achieve it that same year from the municipality of Los Llanos de Aridane. On 16 September 1925, the dictatorial government of Primo de Rivera granted the decree by which Tazacorte obtained independence from Los Llanos. Its first mayor was the teacher and president of the Patriotic Union, Miguel Medina Quesada.

In August 1926, a plague epidemic was declared in Tazacorte, affecting a large number of the population.

On 14 April 1931, after the municipal elections, King Alfonso XIII went into exile from Spain and declared the Second Republic.

In Tazacorte liberals and republicans celebrate the change of regime in the streets and throwing flyers, then begins a period of intense political activity in the municipality. With the democracy begins the direct participation of the popular classes in politics, which in Tazacorte brings a great union development and an important rise of communism. In 1931, the Sindicato Oficios Varios was re-founded, and in just three years the 800 salaried workers and small farmers registered in Tazacorte joined it. In 1932, the Workers' and Peasants' Group was formed, with a communist character, which won by an absolute majority, obtaining six councillors, the municipal elections of 1933 and in the general elections of 1936 it obtained 72.2% of the votes for the Popular Front.

August 1931, the newspaper Tribuna appeared and the following year it changed its name to Tribuna Libre, a newspaper that was published until 1935 under the direction of Miguel Ángel Rodríguez García, a journalist who returned from Argentina.

The coup d'état and military pronouncement of 17 and 18 July 1936 against the government of the Second Republic became known in Tazacorte, during the morning of 18 July, through the radio stations. At that time it was Mayor Francisco Pulido, who, after the military uprising, left municipal control in the hands of a commission sponsored by the Oficios Varios Union. This commission declares a general strike to which the workers respond in an absolute paralysis of the town, only continuing with the irrigation to avoid that the crops are lost.

In 1979, in the first municipal elections of the democracy, the candidacy of the Communist Party won.

== Demography ==
Year	Population
1991	6,502
1996	6,909
2001	5,062
2002	6,108
2003	6,107
2004	5,797
2013	4,911
2014	4,620

=== Population by nucleus ===
Breakdown of the population according to the Continuous Register by Unit of the INE.

Nucleus	Residents (2014)	Men	Women
Cardón	85	44	41
La Costa	464	234	230
Marina	300	144	156
Puerto	1187	607	580
San Borondón	266	135	131
Tarajal	27	13	14
Tazacorte	2515	1274	1241

== See also ==
- List of municipalities in Santa Cruz de Tenerife
